= Daytime =

Period of a day in which a location experiences natural illumination

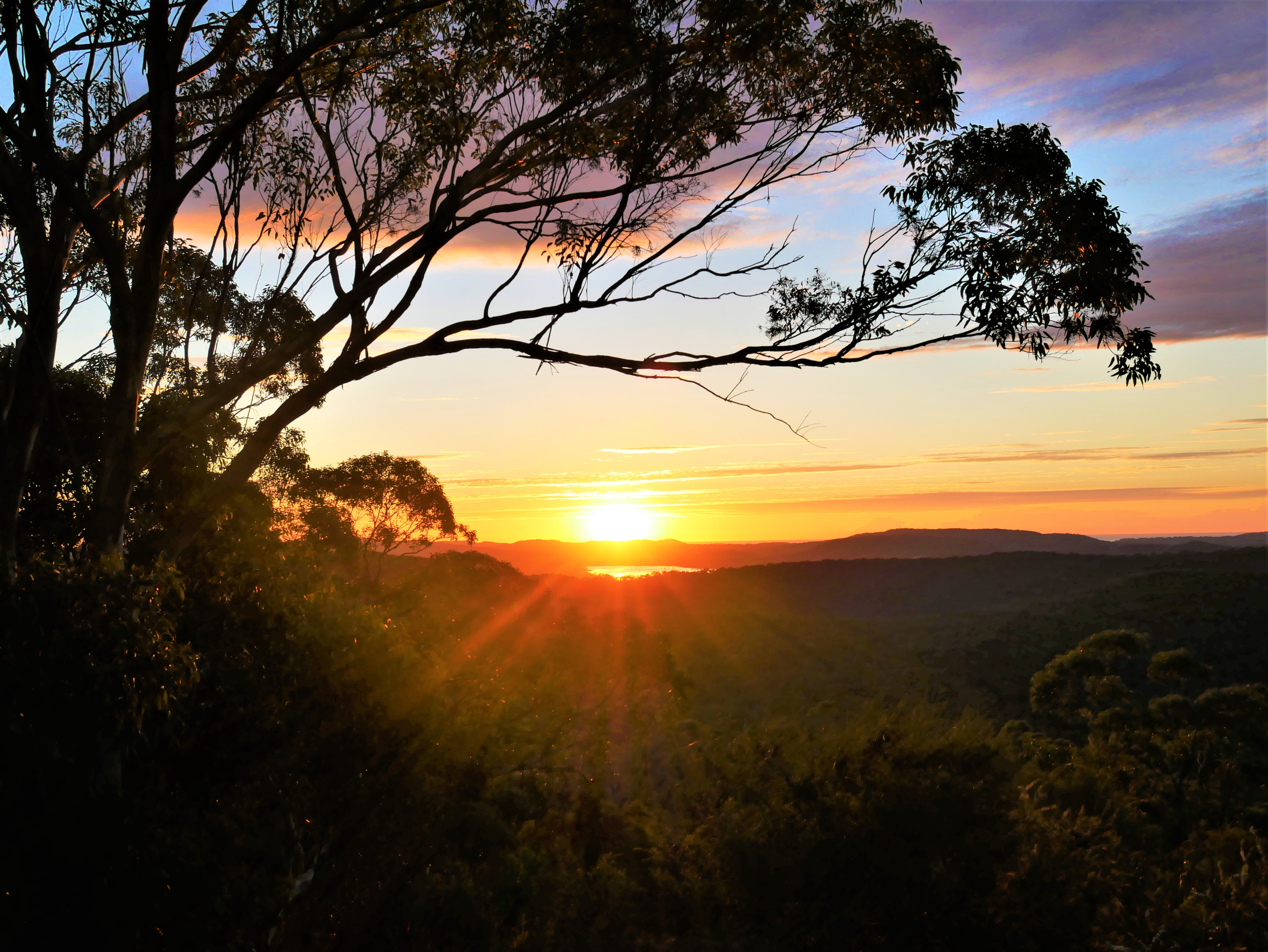
Sunrise in Brisbane Water National Park, Australia

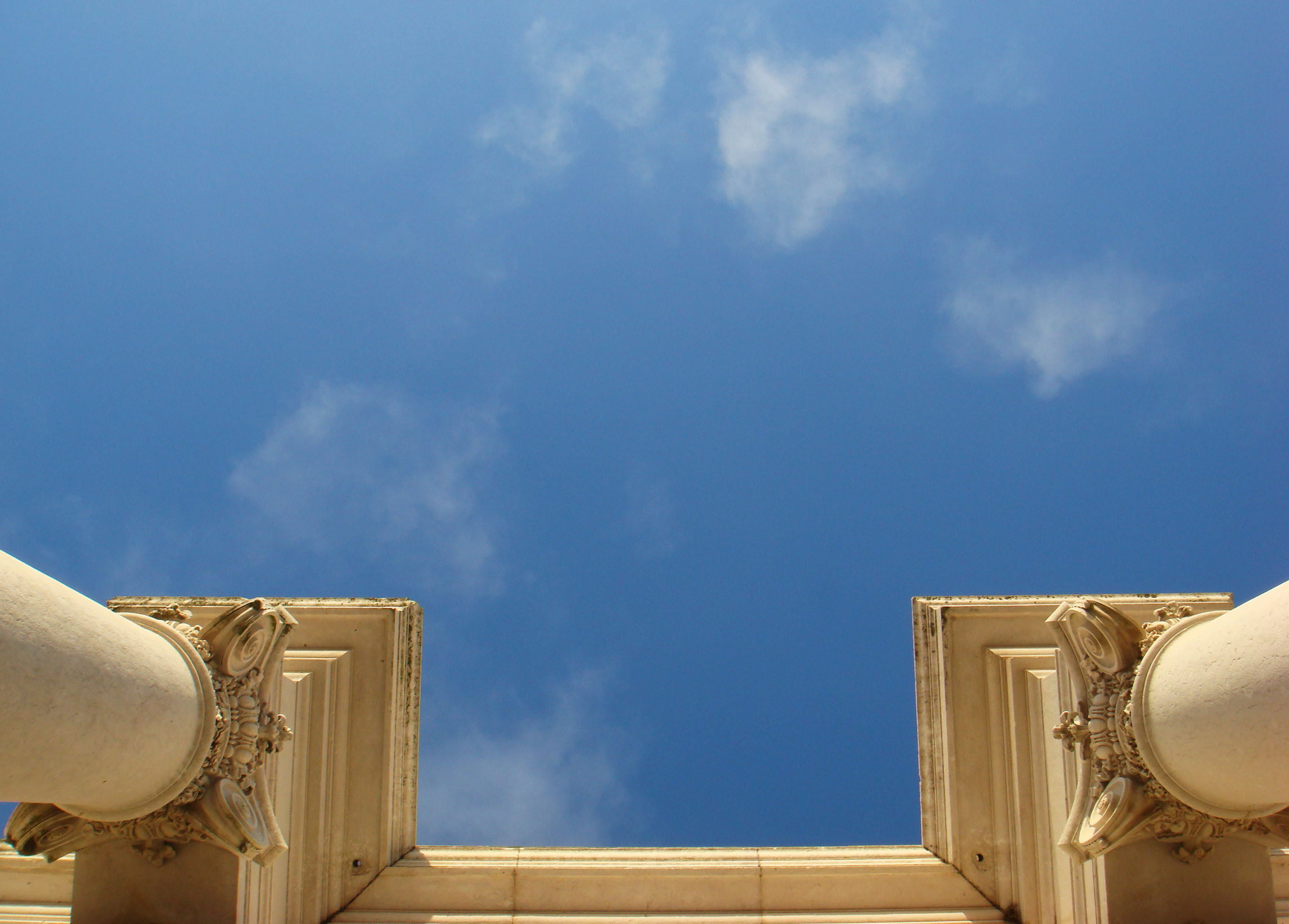
A daytime sky with white clouds

Daytime is the period of the day in which the Sun is above the local horizon in a given location. It is sometimes just called "day". During the daytime an area is illuminated by daylight, a combination of direct sunlight and indirect light from the sky. At any given time, about half of the Earth is facing the Sun and experiencing daytime. The length of daytime varies with latitude and changes over the course of the year, as the Earth moves around the Sun. Other planets and natural satellites that rotate relative to a luminous primary body such as a local star also experience daytime, but this article primarily discusses daytime on Earth.

== Characteristics ==
Approximately half of Earth is illuminated at any time by the Sun, but because of atmospheric and other effects that extend the reach of indirect illumination, the area of the planet covered by either direct or indirect illumination amounts to slightly more than half the surface.

The almost-hemispherical part of Earth experiencing daytime at any given instant changes continuously as the planet rotates on its own axis. The axis of the Earth's rotation is not perpendicular to the plane of its orbit around the Sun (which is parallel with the direction of sunlight), and so the length of the daytime period varies from one point on the planet to another. Additionally, since the axis of rotation is relatively fixed in comparison to the stars, it moves with respect to the Sun as the planet orbits the star. This creates seasonal variations in the length of the daytime period at most points on the planet's surface.

The period of daytime from the standpoint of a surface observer is roughly defined as the period between sunrise, when the Earth's rotation towards the east first causes the Sun's disc to appear above the horizon, to sunset, when the continuing rotation of the Earth causes the Sun's disc to disappear below the horizon to the west. Because the Sun is a luminous disc as seen from the Earth, rather than a point source of light, sunrise and sunset are not instantaneous and the exact definition of both can vary with context. Additionally, the Earth's atmosphere further bends and diffuses light from the Sun and lengthens the period of sunrise and sunset. For a certain period after sunset and before sunrise, indirect light from the Sun lightens the sky on Earth; this period is often referred to as twilight.

== Daytime length variations with latitude and seasons ==
Day length as a function of latitude and the day of the year. Latitude 40° N (approximately New York City, Madrid and Beijing) is highlighted as an example.

A plot of hours of daylight as a function of the date for changing latitudes. This plot was created using the simple sunrise equation, approximating the sun as a single point and does not take into account effects caused by the atmosphere or the diameter of the sun.

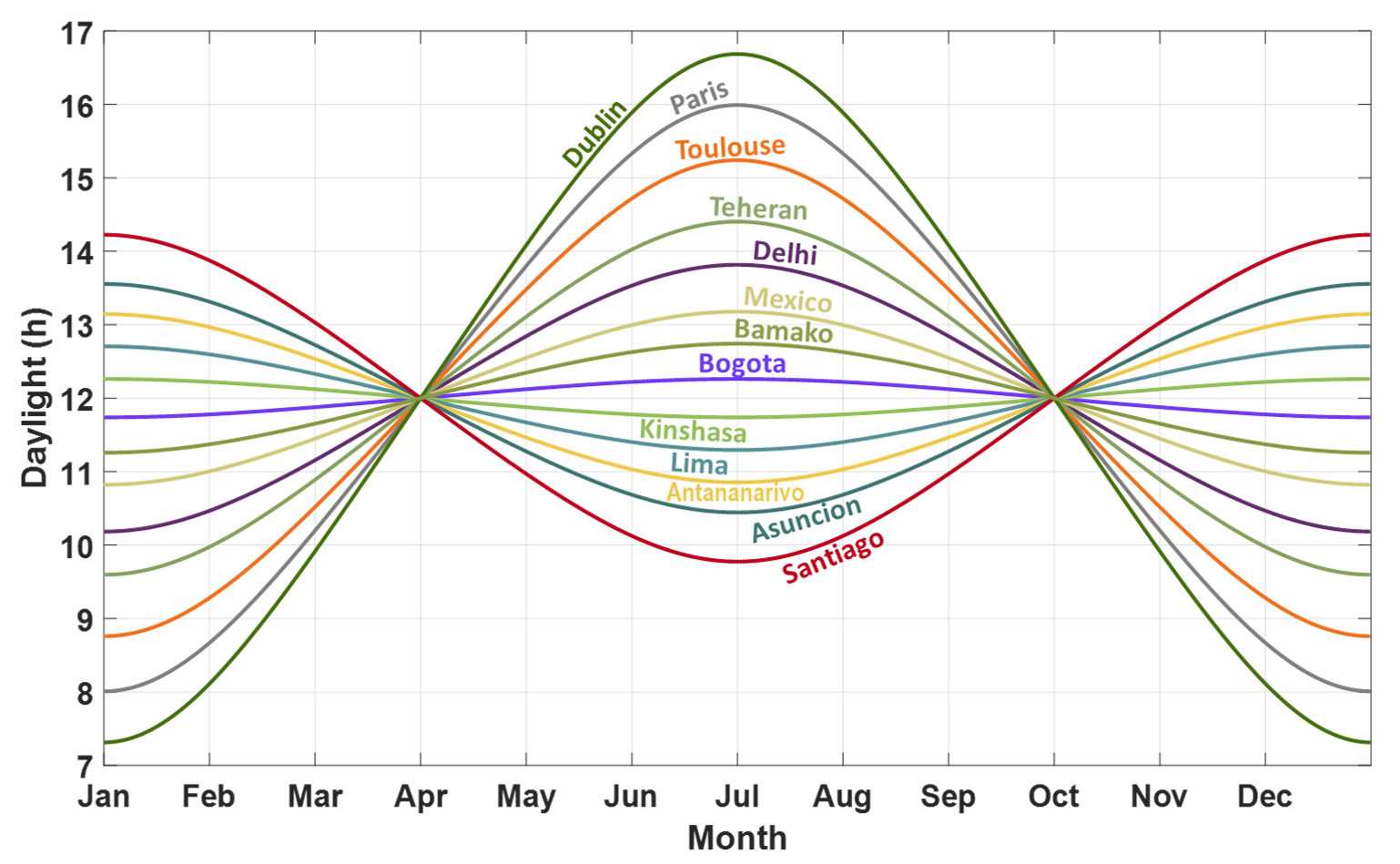
Duration of sunlight in different cities around the world located at different latitudes throughout the year. Computed using the Sunrise equation.

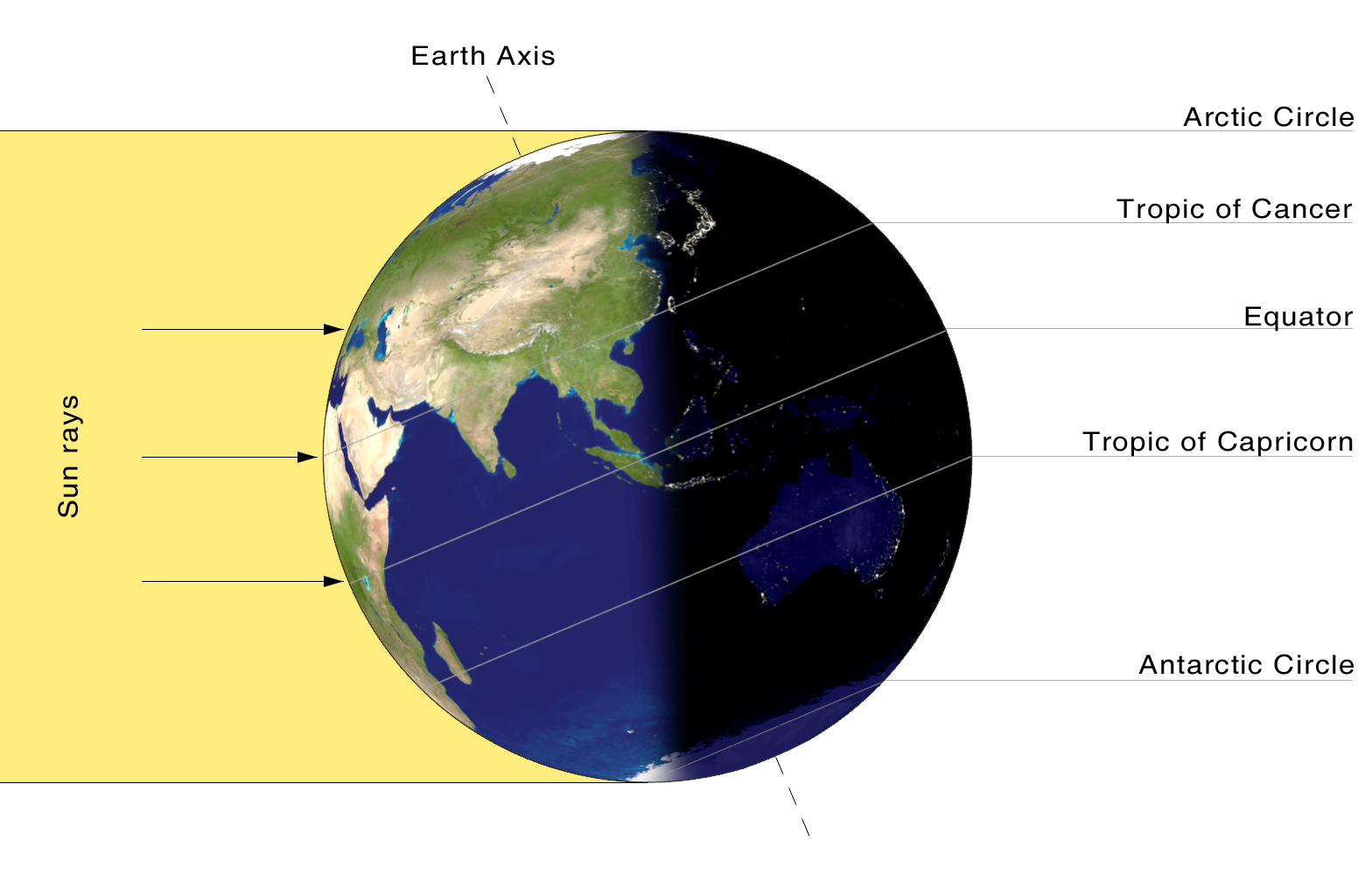
Earth daylight on the June solstice

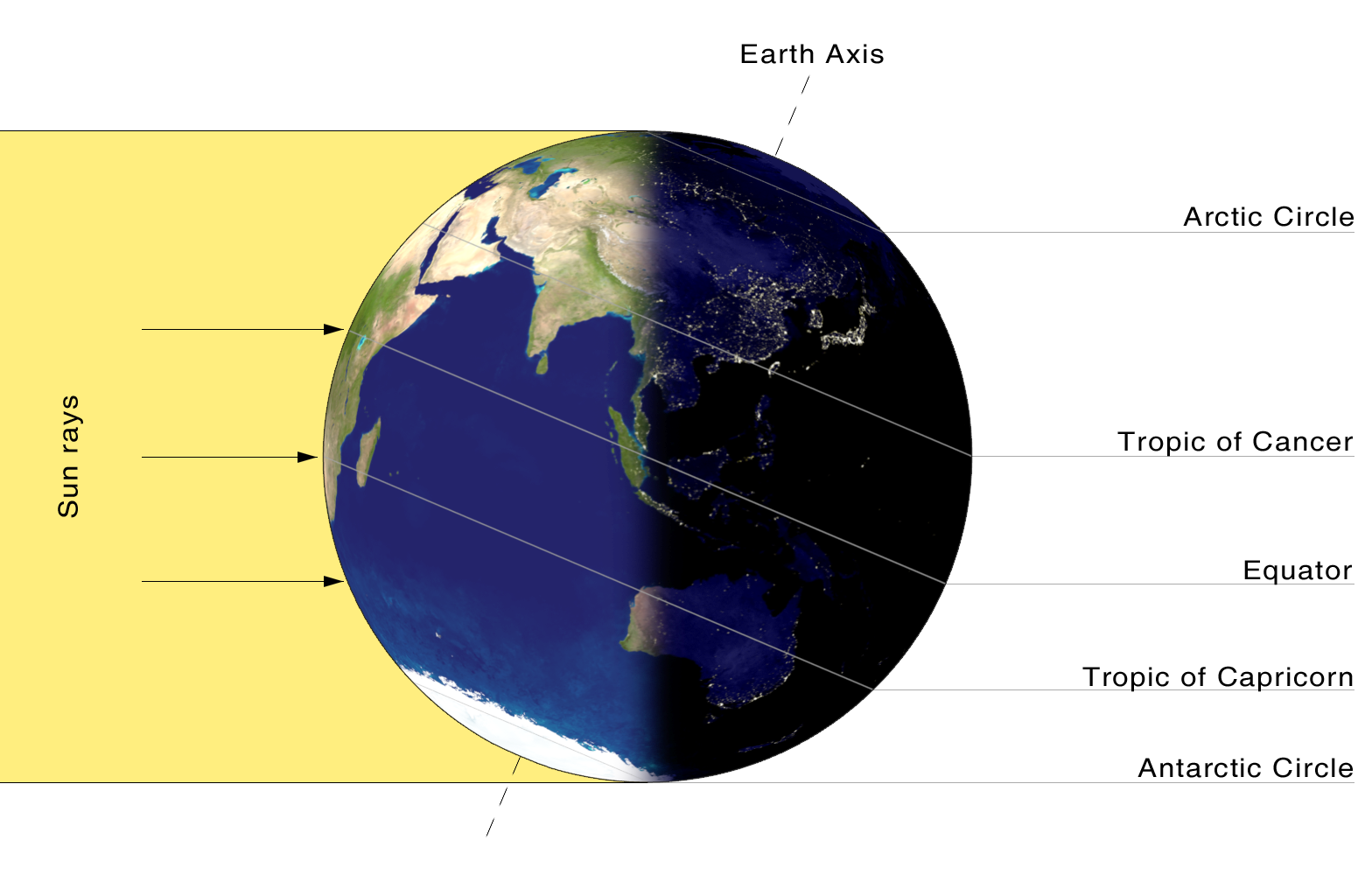
Earth daylight on the December solstice

Daytime length or daytime duration is the time elapsed between beginning and end of the daytime period. Given that Earth's own axis of rotation is tilted 23.44° to the line perpendicular to its orbital plane, called the ecliptic, the length of daytime varies with the seasons on the planet's surface, depending on the observer's latitude. Areas tilted toward the Sun are experiencing summer. Their tilt toward the Sun leads to more than half of the day seeing daylight and warmer temperatures, due to the higher directness of solar rays, the longer period of daytime itself, and less absorption of sunlight in the atmosphere. While increased daylight can have some effect on the higher temperatures in the summer, most of temperature rise results from the directness of the Sun, not the increased daylight. The high angles (around the zenith) of the Sun causes the tropics to be warm, while low angles (barely above the horizon) causes the polar regions to be cold. The slight effect of daylight hours on average seasonal temperature can be seen with the poles and tropical regions. The poles are still cold during their respective summers, despite seeing 24 hours of daylight for six months, while the Equator remains warm throughout the year, with only 12 hours of daylight per day.

Although the daytime length at the Equator remains 12 hours in all seasons, the duration at all other latitudes varies with the seasons. During the winter, daytime lasts shorter than 12 hours; during the summer, it lasts longer than 12 hours. Northern winter and southern summer concur, while northern summer and southern winter concur.

=== At the Equator ===
At the Equator, the daytime period always lasts about 12 hours, regardless of season. As viewed from the Equator, the Sun always rises and sets roughly vertically, following an apparent path close to perpendicular to the horizon.

From the March equinox to the September equinox, the Sun rises within 23.44° north of due east, and sets within 23.44° north of due west. From the September equinox to the March equinox, the Sun rises within 23.44° south of due east and sets within 23.44° south of due west. The Sun's path lies entirely in the northern half of the celestial sphere from the March equinox to the September equinox, but lies entirely in the southern half of the celestial sphere from the September equinox to the March equinox. On the equinoxes, the equatorial Sun culminates at the zenith, passing directly overhead at solar noon.

The fact that the equatorial Sun is always so close to the zenith at solar noon explains why the tropical zone contains the warmest regions on the planet overall. Additionally, the Equator sees the shortest sunrise or sunset because the Sun's path across the sky is so nearly perpendicular to the horizon. On the equinoxes, the solar disk takes only two minutes to traverse the horizon (from top to bottom at sunrise and from bottom to top at sunset).

=== In the tropics ===
The tropics occupy a zone of Earth's surface between 23.44° north and 23.44° south of the Equator. Within this zone, the Sun will pass almost directly overhead (or culminate) on at least one day per year. The line of 23.44° north latitude is called the Tropic of Cancer, because when it was named, the Sun passed overhead at this location at the time of year when it was near the constellation of Cancer. The equivalent line of south latitude is called the Tropic of Capricorn, for similar reasons. The sun enters and leaves each zodiacal constellation slightly later each year at the rate of about 1 day every 72 years. For more information, see precession of the equinoxes.

On the Tropical Circles, the Sun is directly overhead only once per year, on the corresponding solstice. At latitudes closer to the Equator and on the Equator itself, it will be overhead twice per year (on the equinoxes in the case of the Equator), leading to the Lahaina Noon or zero shadow day phenomenon. Outside the tropics, the Sun never passes directly overhead.

=== Around the poles ===
Around the poles, which coincide with the rotational axis of Earth as it passes through the surface, the seasonal variations in the length of daytime are extreme. In fact, within 23.44° latitude of the poles, there will be at least some days each year during which the sun never goes below the horizon. There will also be days when the Sun never rises above the horizon. This number will be fewer, but close to the number of days in the summer where the sun doesn't set (for example the sunrise is usually a few days before the spring equinox and extends a few days past the fall equinox). This phenomenon of more daylight than night is not unique to the poles. In fact, at any given time slightly more than half of the earth is in daylight. The 24 hours of summer daylight is known as the midnight sun that is famous in some northern countries. To the north, the Arctic Circle marks this 23.44° boundary. To the south, the Antarctic Circle marks the boundary. These boundaries correspond to 66.56° north or south latitude, respectively. Because the sky is still bright and stars can't be seen when the sun is less than 6 degrees under the horizon, 24-hour nights with stars visible all the time only happen beyond 72°34' north or south latitude.

At and near the poles, the Sun never rises very high above the horizon, even in summer, which is one of reasons why these regions of the world are consistently cold in all seasons (others include the effect of albedo, the relative increased reflection of solar radiation of snow and ice). Even at the summer solstice, when the Sun reaches its highest point above the horizon at noon, it is still only 23.44° above the horizon at the poles. Additionally, as one approaches the poles the apparent path of the Sun through the sky each day diverges increasingly from the vertical. As summer approaches, the Sun rises and sets become more northerly in the north and more southerly in the south. At the poles, the path of the Sun is indeed a circle, which is roughly equidistant above the horizon for the entire duration of the daytime period on any given day. The circle gradually sinks below the horizon as winter approaches, and gradually rises above it as summer approaches. At the poles, apparent sunrise and sunset may last for several days.

=== At middle latitudes ===
At middle latitudes, far from both the Equator and the poles, variations in the length of daytime are moderate. In the higher middle latitudes where Montreal, Paris and Ushuaia are located, the difference in the length of the day from summer to winter can be very noticeable: the sky may still be lit at 10 pm in summer, but may be dark at 5 pm in winter. In the lower middle latitudes where southern California, Egypt and South Africa are located, the seasonal difference is smaller, but still results in approximately 4 hours difference in daylight between the winter and summer solstices. The difference becomes less pronounced the closer one gets to the equator. An approximation to the monthly change can be obtained from the rule of twelfths.

=== Variations in solar noon ===
The exact instant of solar noon, when the Sun reaches its highest point in the sky, varies with the seasons. This variation is quantified by the equation of time; the magnitude of variation is about 30 minutes over the course of a year.

== See also ==
- Daylight saving time
- Solar eclipse
- Sunrise equation
- Sunshine duration
