= Lahaina Noon =

Tropical solar phenomenon

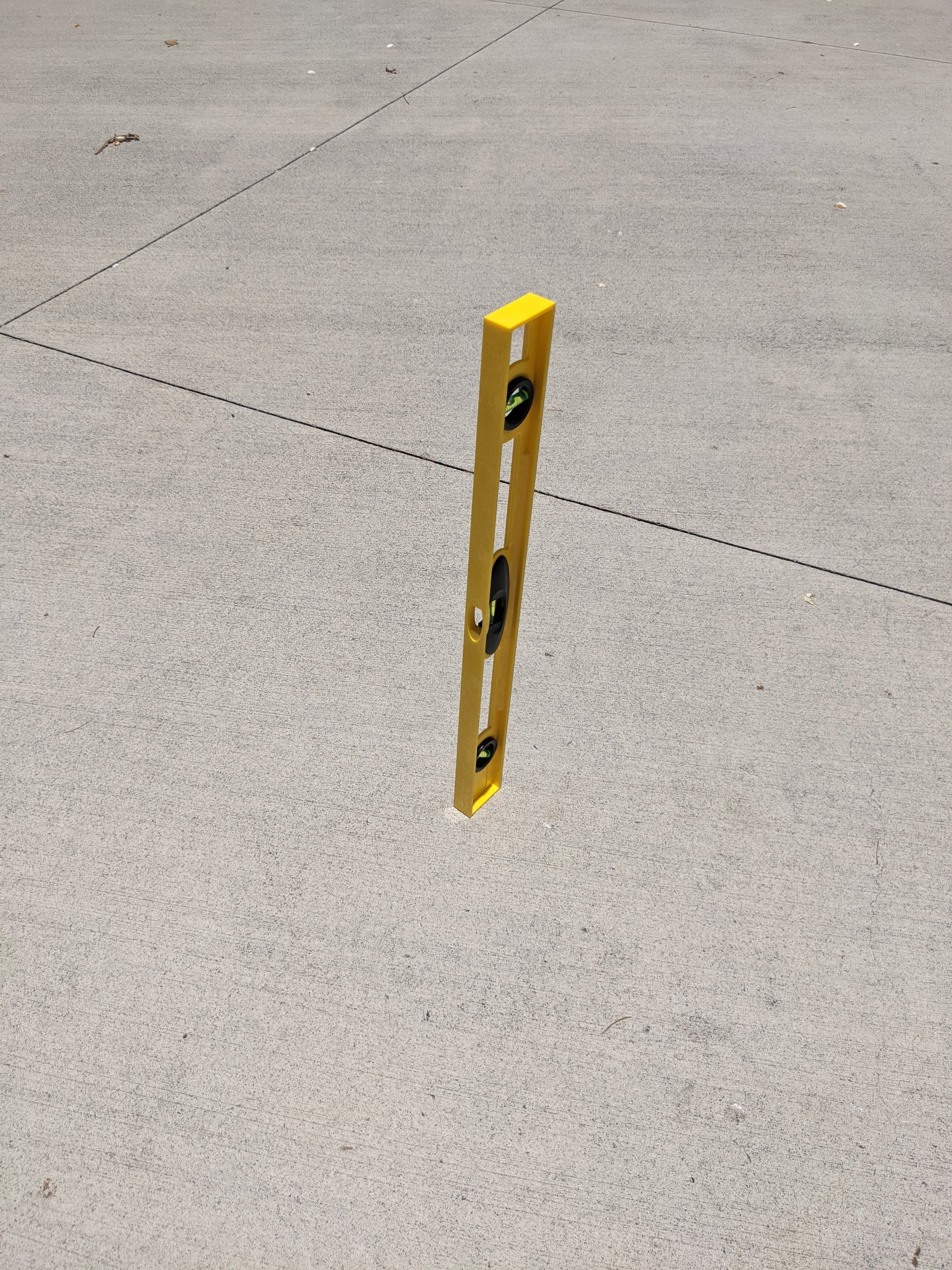
A level photographed during Lāhainā Noon in Hawaii

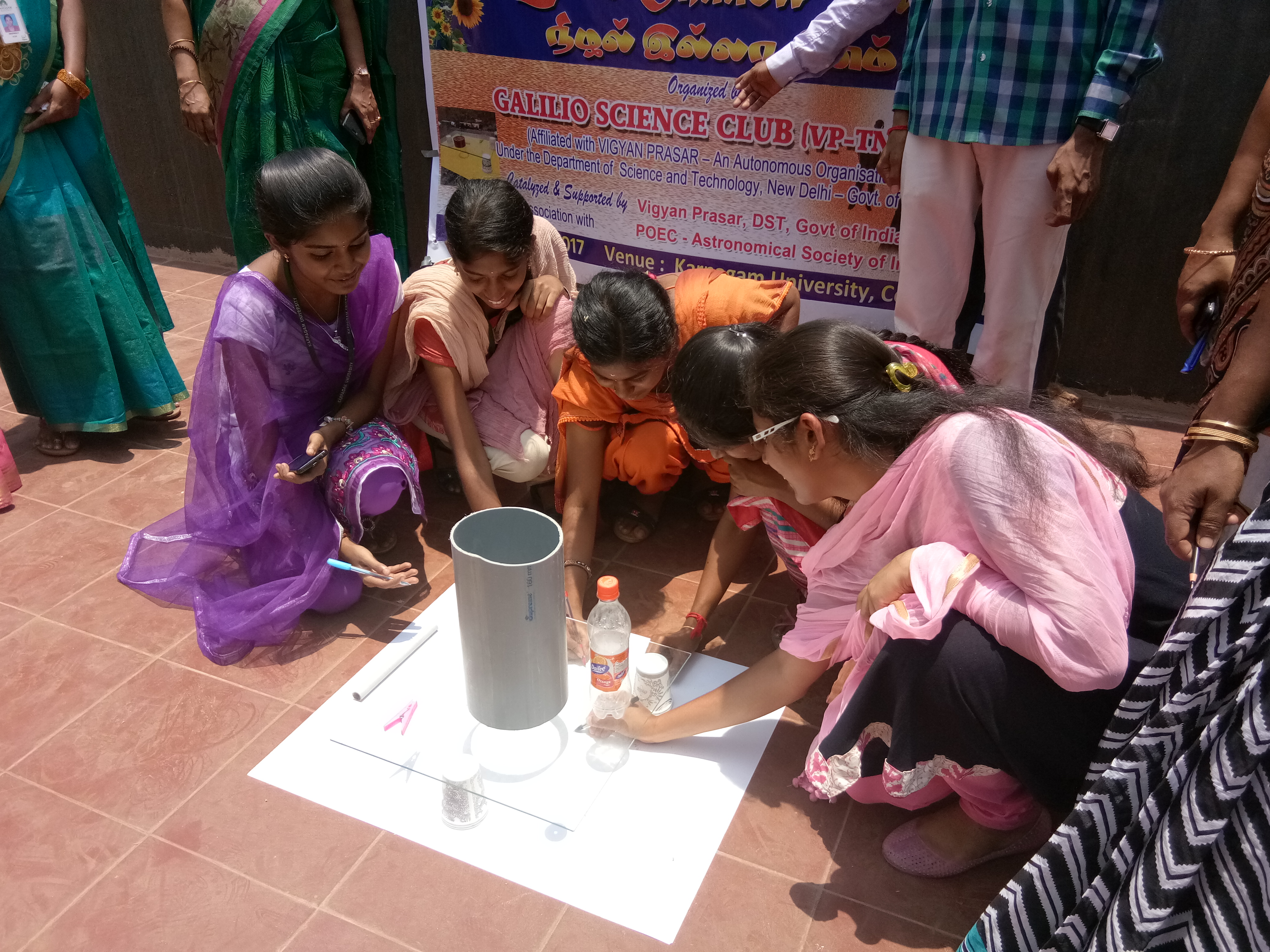
Students performing an experiment on a zero-shadow day in Tamil Nadu

Lāhainā Noon, also known as a zero-shadow day, is a semiannual tropical solar phenomenon when the Sun culminates at the zenith at solar noon, passing directly overhead. As a result, the sun's rays will fall exactly vertical relative to an object on the ground and cast no observable shadow. When this occurs at a given location, the location is Earth's subsolar point. A zero shadow day occurs twice a year for locations in the tropics (between the Tropic of Cancer at latitude 23.4° N and the Tropic of Capricorn at 23.4° S) when the Sun's declination becomes equal to the latitude of the location, so that the date varies by location. The term "Lāhainā Noon" was initiated by the Bishop Museum in Hawaii.

== Details ==
The subsolar point at Honolulu during Lahaina Noon with the range of possible subsolar points shaded in purple – the angle between the Sun and the local horizontal level is exactly 90° at the subsolar point

The subsolar point travels through the tropics. Hawaii is the only US state in the tropics and thus the only one to experience Lāhainā Noon. For 2026, the phenomenon occurs in Honolulu on May 26 and July 16. Hawaii and other locations between the Tropic of Cancer and Tropic of Capricorn receive the sun's direct rays as the apparent path of the sun passes overhead before and after the summer solstice.

Lāhainā Noon can occur anywhere from 12:16 to 12:43 pm Hawaii–Aleutian Standard Time. At that moment objects that stand straight up (flagpoles, bollards, telephone poles, etc.) cast no outward shadow. The most southerly points in Hawaii experience Lāhainā Noon on earlier and later dates than the northern parts. For example, in 2001 Hilo on the Island of Hawaii encountered the overhead sun around May 18 and July 24, Kahului, Maui, on May 24 and July 18, Honolulu, Oahu, on May 26 and July 15 and Lihue, Kauai, on May 31 and July 11. Between each pair of dates, the sun is slightly to the north at solar noon.

Chosen in a contest sponsored by the Bishop Museum in the 1990s, Lāhainā Noon was the selected appellation because lā hainā (the old name for Lāhainā, Hawaii) means "cruel sun" in the Hawaiian language. The ancient Hawaiian name for the event was kau ka lā i ka lolo which translates as "the sun rests on the brains."

=== Subsolar dates ===
Approximate subsolar point dates vs. latitude superimposed on a world map, the example in blue denoting Lahaina Noon in Honolulu.

== In popular culture ==
The event is often covered by Hawaiian media. Activities are associated with the event.

Sky Gate, a unique sculpture in Honolulu created by artist and landscape architect Isamu Noguchi, features a bendy, bumpy ring that has large changes in height around its circumference. Most of the year, it makes a curvy, twisted shadow on the ground, but during Lāhainā Noon, the height-changing ring casts a perfect circular shadow on the ground. There are often activities held by the City & County of Honolulu around the time of the event on the Frank Fasi Civic Grounds, where the sculpture is located.

The phenomenon occurs in stories, including "Lāhainā Noon" by Eric Paul Shaffer (Leaping Dog, 2005), which won the Ka Palapala Po'okela book award for Excellence in "Aloha from beyond Hawaii".

=== Gallery ===
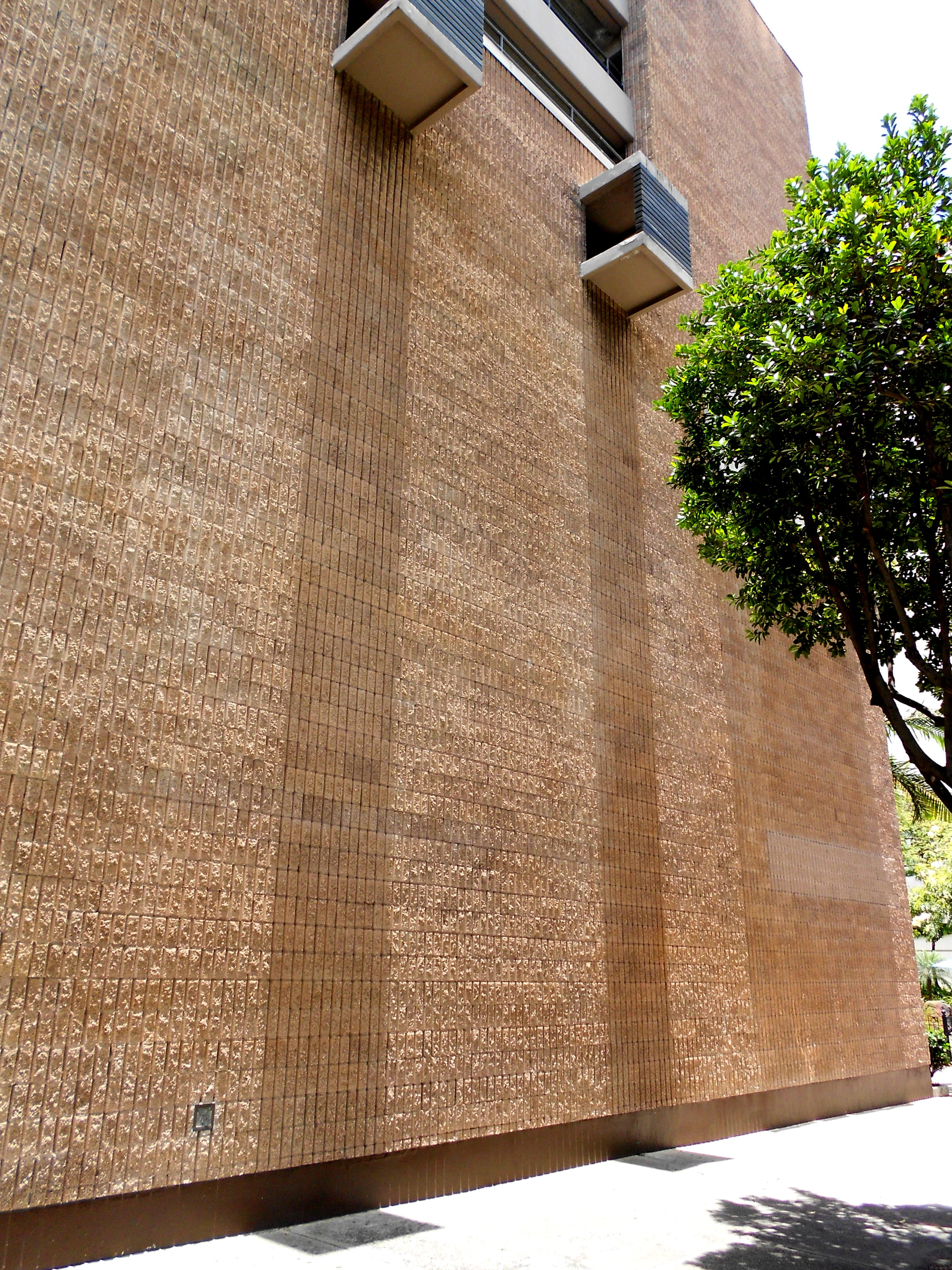
Lāhainā Noon in Downtown Honolulu

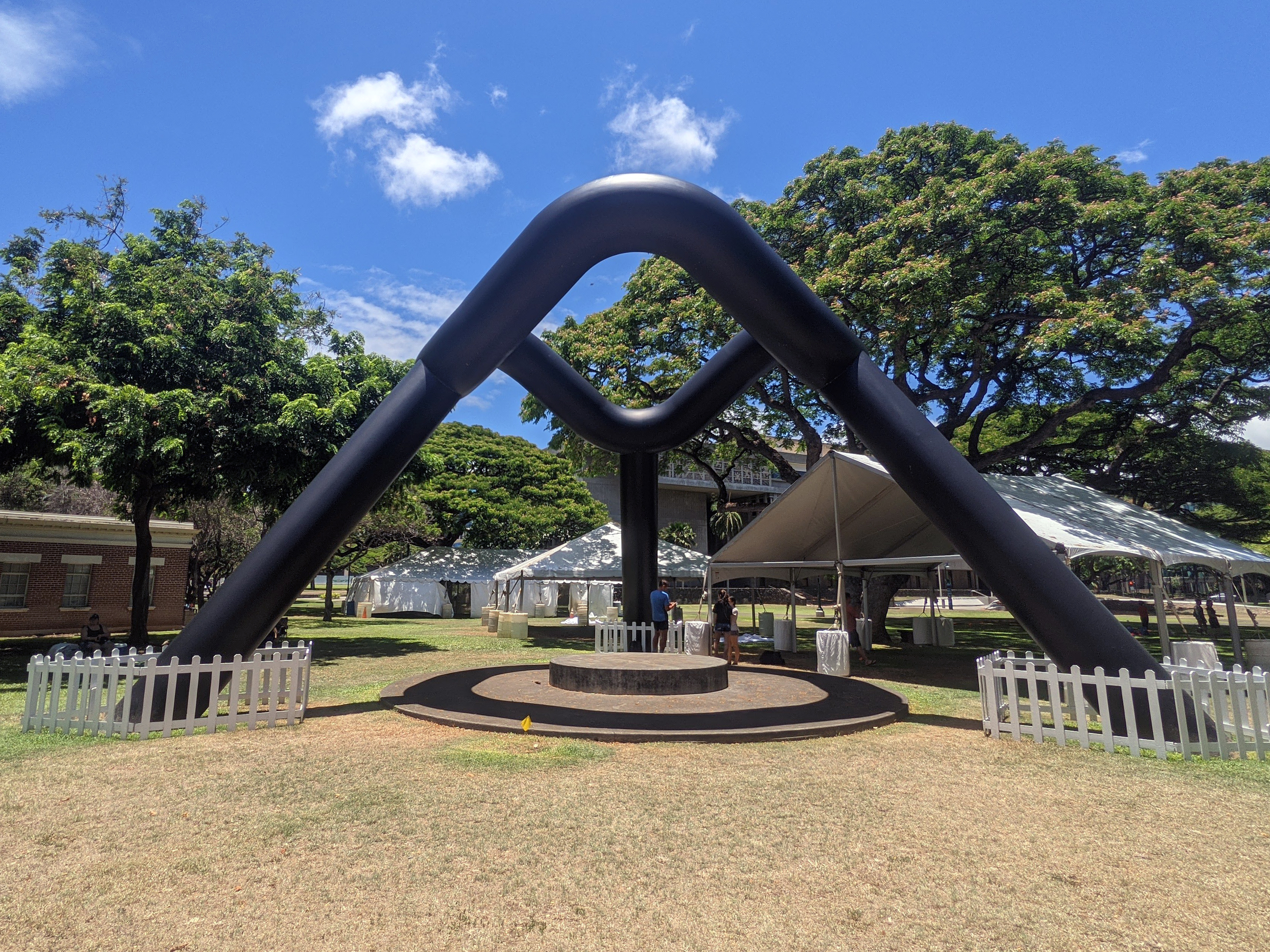
Sky Gate by Isamu Noguchi

== See also ==
- Qibla observation by shadows – Method of determining the direction of Mecca
- Sundial – Time-telling device
