= Meridian (geography) =

Line between the poles with the same longitude

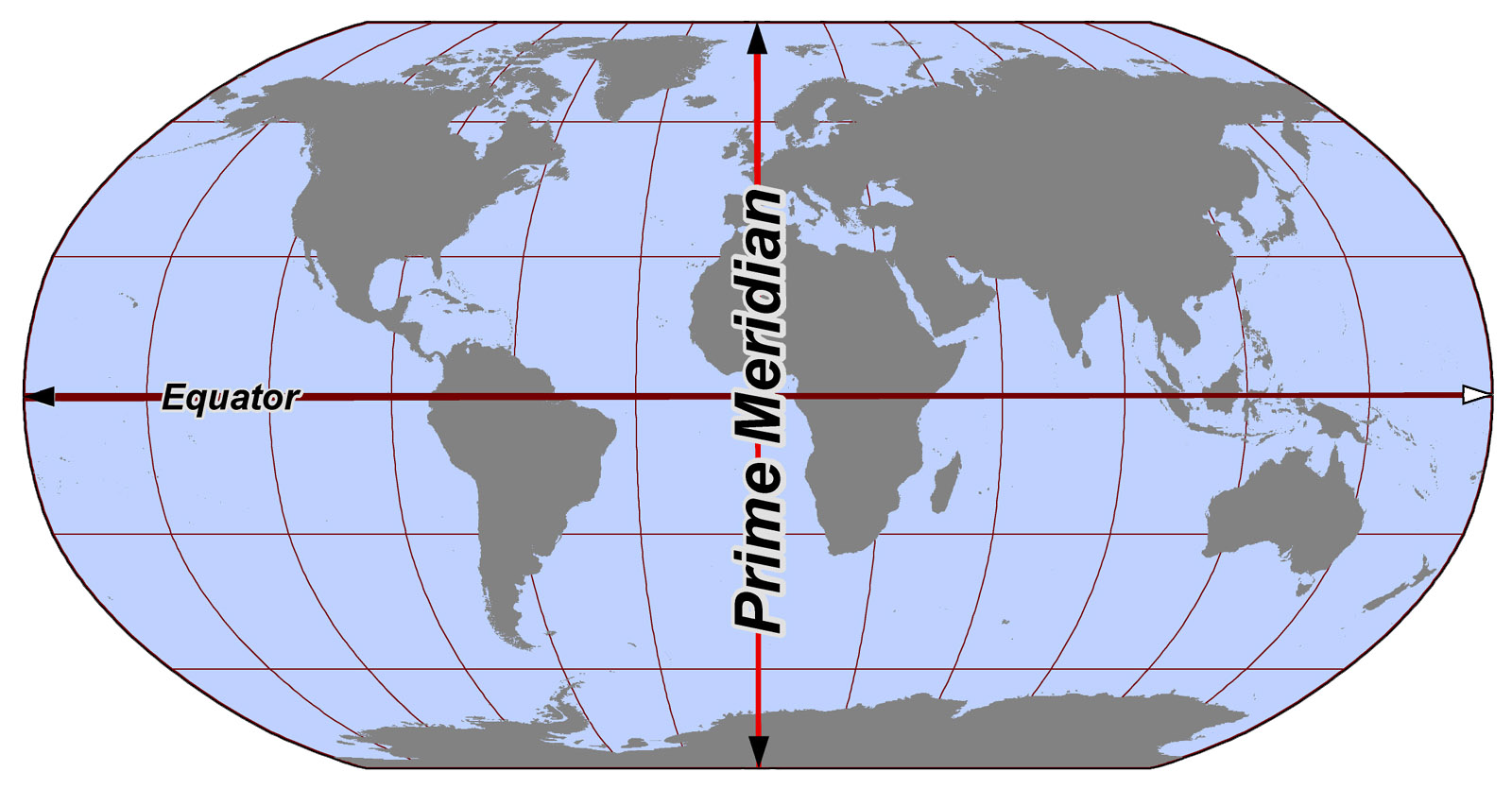
Meridians run between the North and South poles.

In geography and geodesy, a meridian is the locus connecting points of equal longitude, which is the angle (in degrees or other units) east or west of a given prime meridian (currently, the IERS Reference Meridian). In other words, it is a coordinate line for longitudes, a line of longitude. The position of a point along the meridian at a given longitude is given by its latitude, measured in angular degrees north or south of the Equator. On a Mercator projection or on a Gall-Peters projection, each meridian is perpendicular to all circles of latitude. Assuming a spherical Earth, a meridian is a great semicircle on Earth's surface. Adopting instead a spheroidal or ellipsoid model of Earth, the meridian is half of a north-south great ellipse. The length of a meridian is twice the length of an Earth quadrant, equal to 20,003.93144 km (12,429.86673 mi) on a modern ellipsoid (WGS 84).

== Etymology ==
The term meridian comes from the Latin meridies, meaning "midday"; the subsolar point passes through a given meridian at solar noon, midway between the times of sunrise and sunset on that meridian. Likewise, the Sun crosses the celestial meridian at the same time. The same Latin stem gives rise to the terms a.m. (ante meridiem) and p.m. (post meridiem) used to disambiguate hours of the day when utilizing the 12-hour clock.

== History ==
The first prime meridian was set by Eratosthenes in 200 BCE. This prime meridian was used to provide measurement of the earth, but had many problems because of the lack of latitude measurement.

By the early modern era, multiple locations were being used as prime meridians. Because each country had its own preferred meridian (or meridians) there was little consistency in how coordinates and relative local times were recorded around the world. However, here were two locations that were most often acknowledged as the geographic location of the meridian: Paris and Greenwich.

By the late 19th century, it was in the best interests of all nations to agree to one standard meridian, to allow a universal system of recording geographical positions and precise times. Older systems were inadequate for increasing mobility. For instance, railway services were difficult to co-ordinate, when each town effectively had its own time zone.

=== International Meridian Conference ===
Because of a growing international economy, there was a demand for a set international prime meridian to make it easier for worldwide traveling which would, in turn, enhance international trading across countries. As a result, a Conference was held in 1884, in Washington, D.C. Twenty-six countries were present at the International Meridian Conference to vote on an international prime meridian. Ultimately the outcome was as follows: there would be only one prime meridian, the prime meridian was to cross and pass at Greenwich (which was the 0°), there would be two longitude directions up to 180° (east being plus and west being minus), there will be a universal day, and the day begins at the mean midnight of the initial meridian.

There were two main reasons for this. The first was that the USA had already chosen Greenwich as the basis for its own national time zone system. The second was that in the late 19th century, 72% of the world's commerce depended on sea-charts which used Greenwich as the Prime Meridian. The recommendation was based on the argument that naming Greenwich as Longitude 0º would be of advantage to the largest number of people.

=== The Greenwich Meridian ===
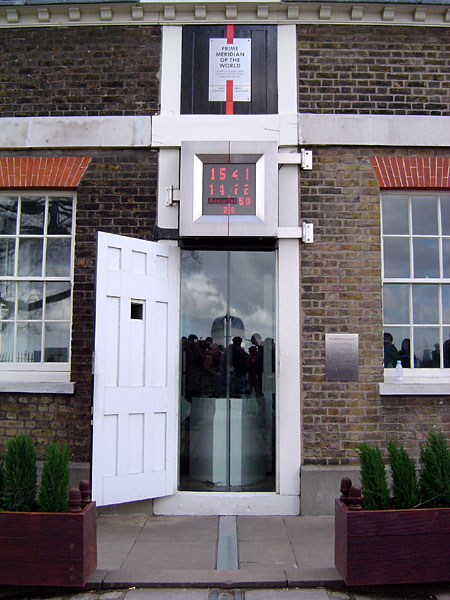
The astronomic prime meridian at Greenwich, England. The geodetic prime meridian is actually 102.478 meters east of this point since the adoption of WGS84.

The meridian through Greenwich (inside Greenwich Park), England, called the Prime Meridian, was set at zero degrees of longitude, while other meridians were defined by the angle at the center of the Earth between where it and the prime meridian cross the equator. As there are 360 degrees in a circle, the meridian on the opposite side of the Earth from Greenwich, the antimeridian, forms the other half of a circle with the one through Greenwich, and is at 180° longitude near the International Date Line (with land mass and island deviations for boundary reasons). The meridians from Greenwich (0°) west to the antimeridian (180°) define the Western Hemisphere and the meridians from Greenwich (0°) east to the antimeridian (180°) define the Eastern Hemisphere. Most maps show the lines of longitude.

The position of the prime meridian has changed a few times throughout history, mainly due to the transit observatory being built next door to the previous one (to maintain the service to shipping). Such changes had no significant practical effect. Historically, the average error in the determination of longitude was much larger than the change in position. The adoption of World Geodetic System 84 (WGS84) as the positioning system has moved the geodetic prime meridian 102.478 metres east of its last astronomic position (measured at Greenwich). The position of the current geodetic prime meridian is not identified at all by any kind of sign or marking at Greenwich (as the older astronomic position was), but can be located using a GPS receiver.

It was later agreed that the official, universal day would be the mean solar day, that it would begin at midnight, and the universal day would not impact the use of local time. However, differing definitions of the beginning and end of a day were still used in some fields and professions. A report published in the Transactions of the Royal Society of Canada, dated 10 May 1894; on the "Unification of the Astronomical, Civil and Nautical Days", noted that:

- the civil day began at midnight and ended at midnight following, and;
- the astronomical day began at noon of the civil day and continued until following noon, as did the nautical day.

== Magnetic meridian ==
The magnetic meridian is an equivalent imaginary line connecting the magnetic south and north poles and can be taken as the horizontal component of magnetic force lines along the surface of the Earth. Therefore, a compass needle will be parallel to the magnetic meridian. However, a compass needle will not be steady in the magnetic meridian, because of the longitude from east to west being complete geodesic. The angle between the magnetic and the true meridian is the magnetic declination, which is relevant for navigating with a compass. Navigators were able to use the azimuth (the horizontal angle or direction of a compass bearing) of the rising and setting Sun to measure the magnetic variation (difference between magnetic and true north).

== True meridian ==
The true meridian is the arc that goes from one pole to the other, passing through the observer, and is contrasted with the magnetic meridian, which goes through the magnetic poles and the observer. The true meridian can be found by careful astronomical observations, and the magnetic meridian is simply parallel to the compass needle. The arithmetic difference between the true and magnetic meridian is called the magnetic declination, which is important for the calibration of compasses.

Henry D. Thoreau classified this true meridian versus the magnetic meridian in order to have a more qualitative, intuitive, and abstract function. He used the true meridian since his compass varied by a few degrees. There were some variations. When he noted the sight line for the True Meridian from his family's house to the depot, he could check the declination of his compass before and after surveying throughout the day. He recorded this variation.

== Meridian passage ==
The meridian passage is the moment when a celestial object passes the meridian of longitude of the observer. At this point, the celestial object is at its highest point. When the Sun passes two times an altitude while rising and setting can be averaged to give the time of meridian passage. Navigators utilized the Sun's declination and the Sun's altitude at local meridian passage, in order to calculate their latitude with the formula.

Latitude = (90° – noon altitude + declination)

The declination of major stars are their angles north and south from the celestial equator. The meridian passage will not occur exactly at 12 hours because of the Earth orbit eccentricity (see Equation of time).

== Standard meridian ==
A standard meridian is a meridian used for determining standard time. For instance, the 30th meridian east (UTC+02:00) is the standard meridian for Eastern European Time. Since the adoption of time zones – as opposed to local mean time or solar time – in the late 19th century and early 20th century, most countries have adopted the standard time of one of the 24 meridians closest to their geographical position, as decided by the International Meridian Conference in 1884. However, a few time zones are offset by increments of 30 or 45 minutes, such as in India, the Chatham Islands, South Australia and Nepal.

== Measurement of Earth rotation ==
Many of these instruments rely on the ability to measure the longitude and latitude of the Earth. These instruments also were typically affected by local gravity, which paired well with existing technologies such as the magnetic meridian.

== List of meridians ==
See the category page for a list of related meridian articles, including geographical notes on specific meridians.

== See also ==
- Meridian (astronomy)
- Meridian arc
- Prime meridian
- Meridian Centre
- Principal meridian
  - Public Land Survey System, United States
  - Dominion Land Survey, Canada
- Greenwich Mean Time - Another facet of historic geolocation relating to Greenwich
