= Qibla observation by shadows =

Method of determining the direction of Mecca

- Twice a year, the Sun passes overhead above the Kaaba, causing shadows of vertical objects to indicate the direction of the qibla.
- Genre: Astronomical phenomena related to Islamic worship
- Dates: 27/28 May, 12:18 SAST (09:18 UTC); 15/16 July 12:27 SAST (09:27 UTC)
- Frequency: Twice a year
- Locations: Worldwide, in locations with an angular distance of less than 90° from the Kaaba

Twice every year, the Sun culminates at the zenith of the Kaaba in Mecca, the holiest site in Islam, at local solar noon, allowing the qibla (the direction towards the Kaaba) to be ascertained in other parts of the world by observing the shadows cast by vertical objects. This phenomenon occurs at 12:18 Saudi Arabia Standard Time (SAST; 09:18 UTC) on 27 or 28 May (depending on the year), and at 12:27 SAST (09:27 UTC) on 15 or 16 July (depending on the year). At these times, the Sun appears in the direction of Mecca, and shadows cast by vertical objects determine the qibla. At two other moments in the year, the Sun passes through the nadir (the antipodal zenith) of the Kaaba, casting shadows on the other side of the Earth that point in the opposite direction, and thus also determine the qibla. These occur on 12, 13, or 14 January at 00:30 SAST (21:30 UTC on the preceding day), and 28 or 29 November at 00:09 SAST (21:09 UTC on the preceding day).

The shadow points towards Mecca because the Sun path makes the subsolar point travel through every latitude between the Tropic of Cancer and the Tropic of Capricorn every year, including the latitude of the Kaaba (21°25′N), and because the Sun crosses the local meridian once a day. This observation has been known since at least the 13th century, when it was noted by the astronomers Jaghmini and Nasir al-Din al-Tusi, but their timings could not be fixed to a particular date because the Islamic calendar is lunar rather than solar; the solar date on which the Sun culminates at the zenith of Mecca is constant, but the lunar date varies from year to year.

== Context ==
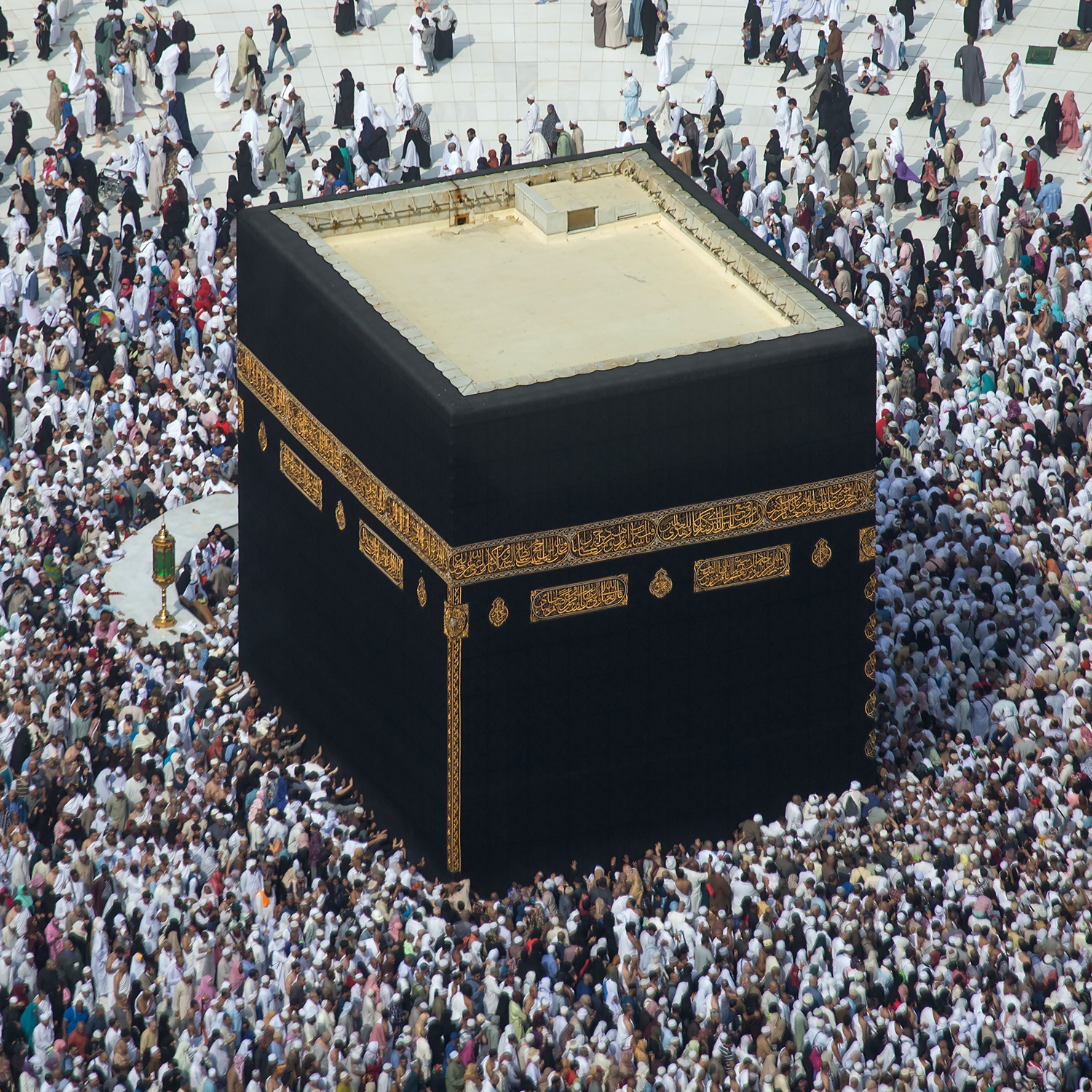
The qibla determines the direction, from any point in the world to the Kaaba, in the Great Mosque of Mecca.

=== Qibla ===
The qibla is the direction of the Kaaba, a cube-shaped building at the centre of the Great Mosque of Mecca (al-Masjid al-Haram) in the Hejaz region of Saudi Arabia. This direction is special in Islamic rituals and religious law because Muslims must face it during daily prayers (salat) and in other religious contexts. The determination of qibla was an important problem for Muslim communities because Muslims are required to know the qibla to perform their daily prayers and because it is needed to determine the orientation of mosques. When Muhammad lived among the Muslims in Medina, which is also in the Hejaz region, he prayed due south, the known direction of Mecca. Within a few generations of Muhammad's death in 632, Muslims had reached places far distant from Mecca, making the determination of the qibla in these new locations problematic. Initially, Muslims relied on traditional folk knowledge methods, but after the introduction of astronomy into the Islamic world, solutions based on mathematical and astronomical knowledge began to be developed in the early 9th century. The shadow-observation method has been attested since at least the 13th century CE.

=== Apparent motions of the Sun ===
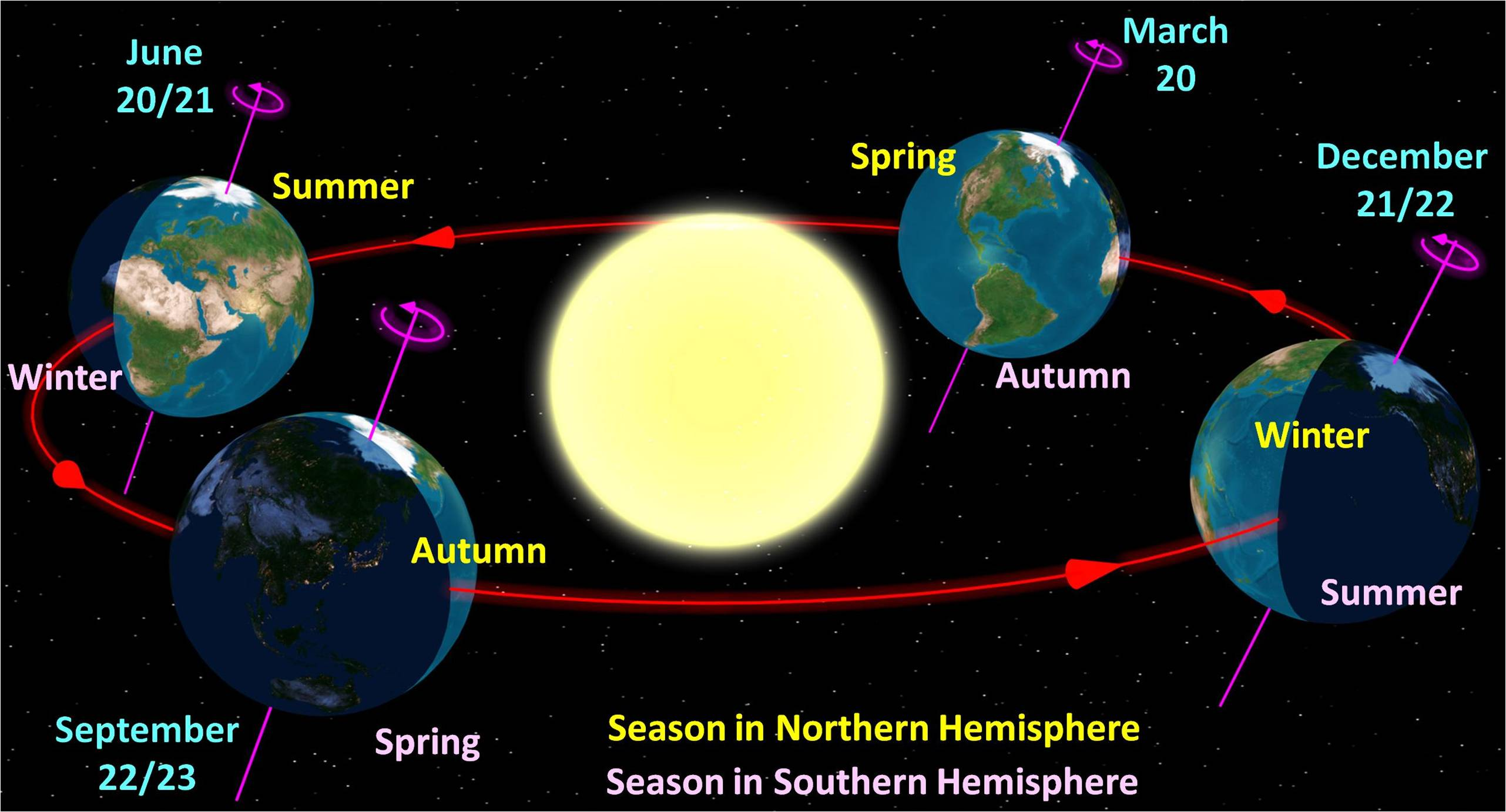
As a result of the Earth's orbit around the Sun, the Sun's latitude position appears to move seasonally between the Tropic of Cancer and the Tropic of Capricorn.

Places on Earth experience the apparent diurnal motion of the Sun from the east to the west, during which it culminates, or reaches its highest point of the day and crosses the local meridian. The Sun also appears to move seasonally between the Tropic of Cancer (approximately 23.5°N) and the Tropic of Capricorn (approximately 23.5°S); therefore, the solar culmination usually occurs to the north or south of the zenith. For locations between the tropics, at certain times of the year, the Sun crosses the local latitude and then culminates at or near the zenith; this location is known as the subsolar point. The Kaaba is located at a latitude of 21°25′N, inside the zone that experiences this phenomenon. In the terminology of Islamic astronomy ('ilm al-falak), these events are called the "great culmination" (al-istiwa al-a'dham).

== Observation ==
On this azimuthal equidistant projection centred on Mecca and shaded to show where rasd al-qibla can be used, when the subsolar point is on the Kaaba, shadows of vertical poles on the sunlit hemisphere point away from it

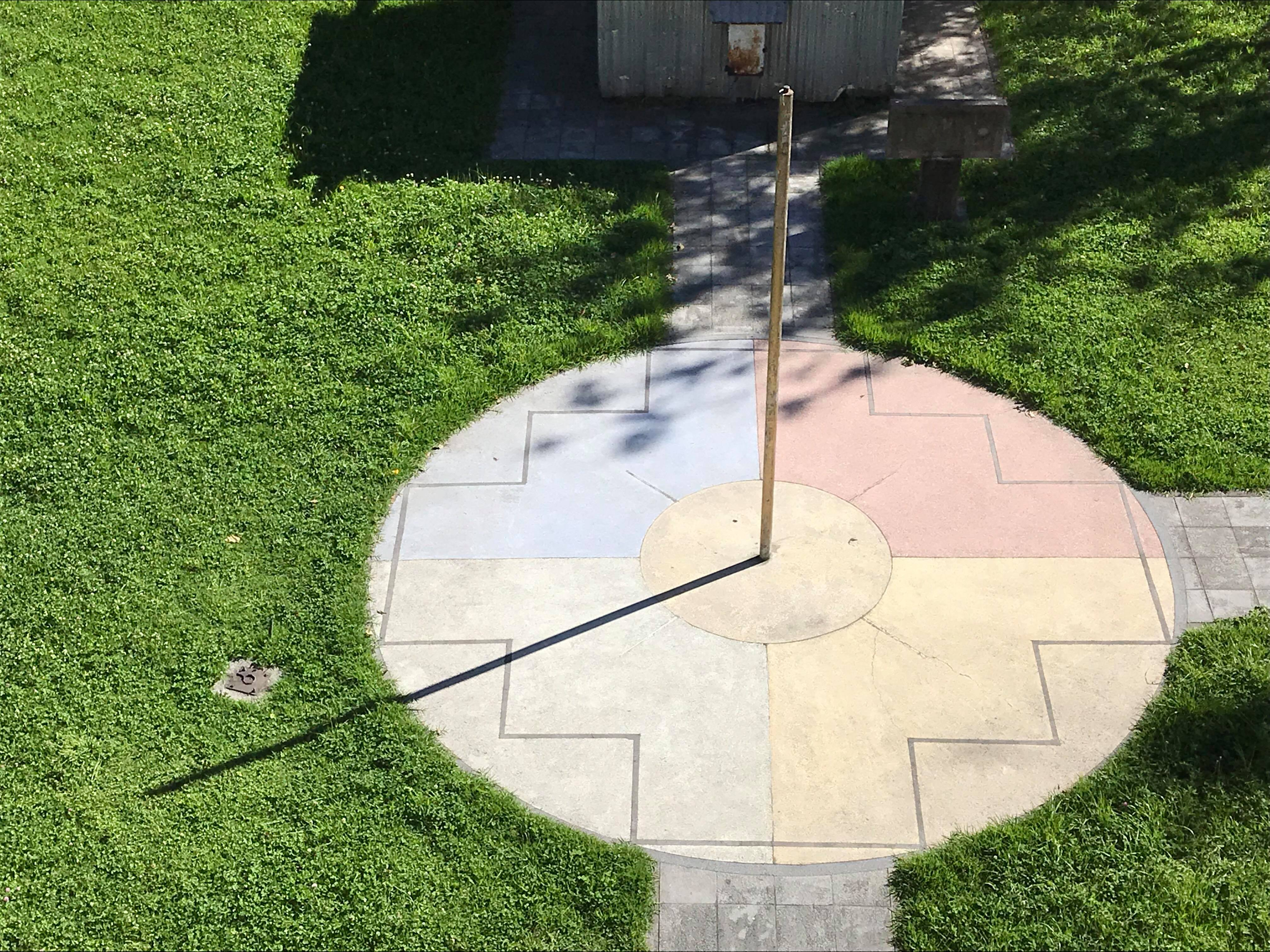
At the time of rasd al-qibla, the shadow of a vertical object indicates the direction of qibla.

The great culmination, when the Sun appears directly over the Kaaba, occurs on 27 or 28 May at approximately 12:18 SAST (09:18 UTC), and on 15 or 16 July at 12:27 SAST (09:27 UTC), coinciding with the solar noon and the Zuhr adhan (midday call to prayer) in Mecca. As the sun crosses almost directly above the Kaaba, any shadow cast by vertical objects on earth will point directly away from the Kaaba, which casts nearly no shadow. This phenomenon allows the direction of the qibla to be determined without needing to perform calculations or to use sophisticated instruments. This observation is called rasd al-qibla ('observing the qibla').

Approximate subsolar point dates vs. latitude superimposed on a world map, the example in blue denoting Lahaina Noon in Honolulu.

This observation is not observable in the hemisphere opposite the Kaaba, since the phenomenon occurs when the Sun is below the horizon. This hemisphere includes most of the Americas, the Pacific Ocean, Australia, and Eastern Indonesia. People in these places can observe a comparable event when the Sun passes directly above the antipodal point of the Kaaba – the point directly opposite on the other side of the Earth. The shadows cast during these times point in the exact opposite direction shown during the rasd al-qibla. The antipodal events occur on 12, 13, or 14 January at 00:30 SAST (21:30 UTC on the previous day), and again on 28 or 29 November 00:09 SAST (21:09 UTC on the previous day). (Note: van Gent 2017 places it on 12/13 January and 28 November while Hadi Bashori 2015, p. 127 mentions 14 January and 29 November. According to both sources, observations made within one or two days at the same time are accurate.) During any of these events, observations made within a five-minute interval, and at the same time one or two days before or after the prescribed date, are accurate with negligible deviation.

A practical problem occurs in locations whose angular distances to Mecca are almost equal to 90 degrees at the edge of the hemisphere centred in Mecca. In these locations, the rasd al-qibla events always occur close to sunrise or sunset. This is the case for several places in the east coast of North America; for instance, the first rasd al-qibla (28 May at 12:18 SAST) occurs six minutes after sunrise in Boston and Montreal, two minutes before sunrise in Ottawa, and eleven minutes before sunrise in New York City. The phenomenon cannot be viewed in New York City and Ottawa, while in Boston and Montreal, the Sun appears so low that the place of observation must be completely unobstructed by buildings or terrain.

=== Daily observation ===
In addition to the twice yearly rasd al-qibla, in most locations the Sun crosses the direct path between the location and the Kaaba each day; at the instant this happens, the Sun's shadow points in the direction of the qibla or its antipodal point. The time of this daily event depends upon the location and the day of the year, and can be determined using geographical data and calculations, but this is more complex than the yearly rasd al-qibla, the times of which are the same globally, with no calculations needed. (Note: An example of the calculation and the geographical data required is presented in Hadi Bashori 2015, pp. 128–130)

== History ==
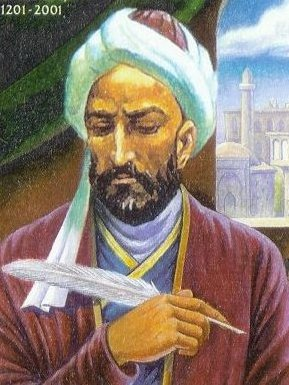
Nasir al-Din al-Tusi (1201–1276), an early astronomer who wrote about qibla observation by shadows.

The method of observing the qibla by shadows was attested by the Central Asian astronomer Jaghmini, who wrote c. 1221 it can be done twice a year when the Sun's position in the ecliptic is at 7°21′, in the constellation Gemini, and 22°39′, in Cancer. Subsequently, Nasir al-Din al-Tusi (1201–1276) also related this method in his work al-Tadhkira al-Nasīriyya fī ʿilm al-Hayʾa ("Memoir on the Science of Astronomy"), although with less precision than Jaghmini:

The sun transits the zenith of Mecca when it is in degree 8 of Gemini and in [degree] 23 of Cancer at noontime there. The difference between its noon and the noon of other localities is measured by the difference between the two longitudes. Let this [latter] difference be taken and let an hour be assumed for each 15 degrees and 4 minutes for each degree. The resulting total is the interval in hours from noon [for that locality]. Let an observation be made on that day at that time – before noon if Mecca is to the east or after if [Mecca] is to the west; the direction of the shadow [of the sun] at that time is [opposite to that of] the qibla bearing.

Al-Tusi stated the two rasd al-qibla days by specifying the Sun's position on the ecliptic (8° Gemini and 23° Cancer), rather than giving specific dates. This is because during their time, the Muslim world used the lunar Islamic calendar rather than a solar one, therefore the two days could not be specified on a fixed day and month. Because the obliquity of the ecliptic is slowly decreasing, the values during the lives of Jaghmini and al-Tusi's differ from modern values. As of 2000, the appropriate solar positions are 6°40′ Gemini and 23°20′ Cancer. Other than specifying the sun's position, the passage by al-Tusi describes how to convert the noontime in Mecca to the local time.

== See also ==
- Lahaina Noon
- Sundial
