= Colatitude =

Complement of latitude; polar angle

In a spherical coordinate system, a colatitude is the complementary angle of a given latitude, i.e. the difference between a right angle and the latitude. In geography, Southern latitudes are defined to be negative, and as a result the colatitude is a non-negative quantity, ranging from zero at the North pole to 180° at the South pole.

The colatitude corresponds to the conventional 3D polar angle in spherical coordinates, as opposed to the latitude as used in cartography.

== Examples ==
Latitude and colatitude sum up to 90°.

Place	Latitude	Colatitude
North pole	90°	0°
Equator	0°	90°
South pole	−90°	180°

== Astronomical use ==
The colatitude is most useful in astronomy because it refers to the zenith distance of the celestial poles. For example, at latitude 42°N, for Polaris (approximately on the North celestial pole), the distance from the zenith (overhead point) to Polaris is 90 − 42 = 48°.

Adding the declination of a star to the observer's colatitude gives the maximum altitude of that star (its angle from the horizon at culmination or upper transit). For example, if Alpha Centauri is seen with upper culmination altitude of 72° north (or 108° south) w.r.t. the observer and its declination is known (60°S), then it can be determined that the observer's colatitude is 108° − 60° = 48° (i.e. the observer's latitude is 90° − 48° = 42°S).

Stars whose declination absolute value exceed the observer's colatitude in the corresponding hemisphere (see culmination) are called circumpolar because they will never set as seen from that latitude. If the star's declination absolute value exceed the observer's colatitude in the opposite hemisphere, then it will never be seen from that location. For example, Alpha Centauri will always be visible at night from Perth, Western Australia (32°S) because the colatitude of Perth is 90° − 32° = 58°, and the declination of Alpha Centauri (-60°) has an absolute value 60 which is greater than 58 in the corresponding hemisphere; on the other hand, the star will never rise in Juneau, Alaska (58°N) because Alpha Centauri's declination absolute value of 60 is more than observer's colatitude (32°) in the opposite hemisphere. Additionally, colatitude is used as part of the Schwarzschild metric in general relativity.
