= Culmination =

Passage of an astronomical body across the meridian

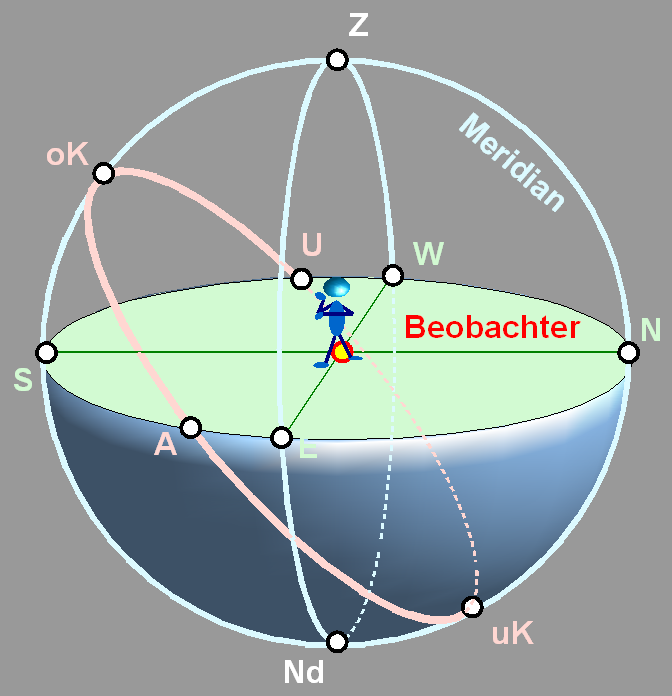
Upper (oK) and lower culmination (uk)

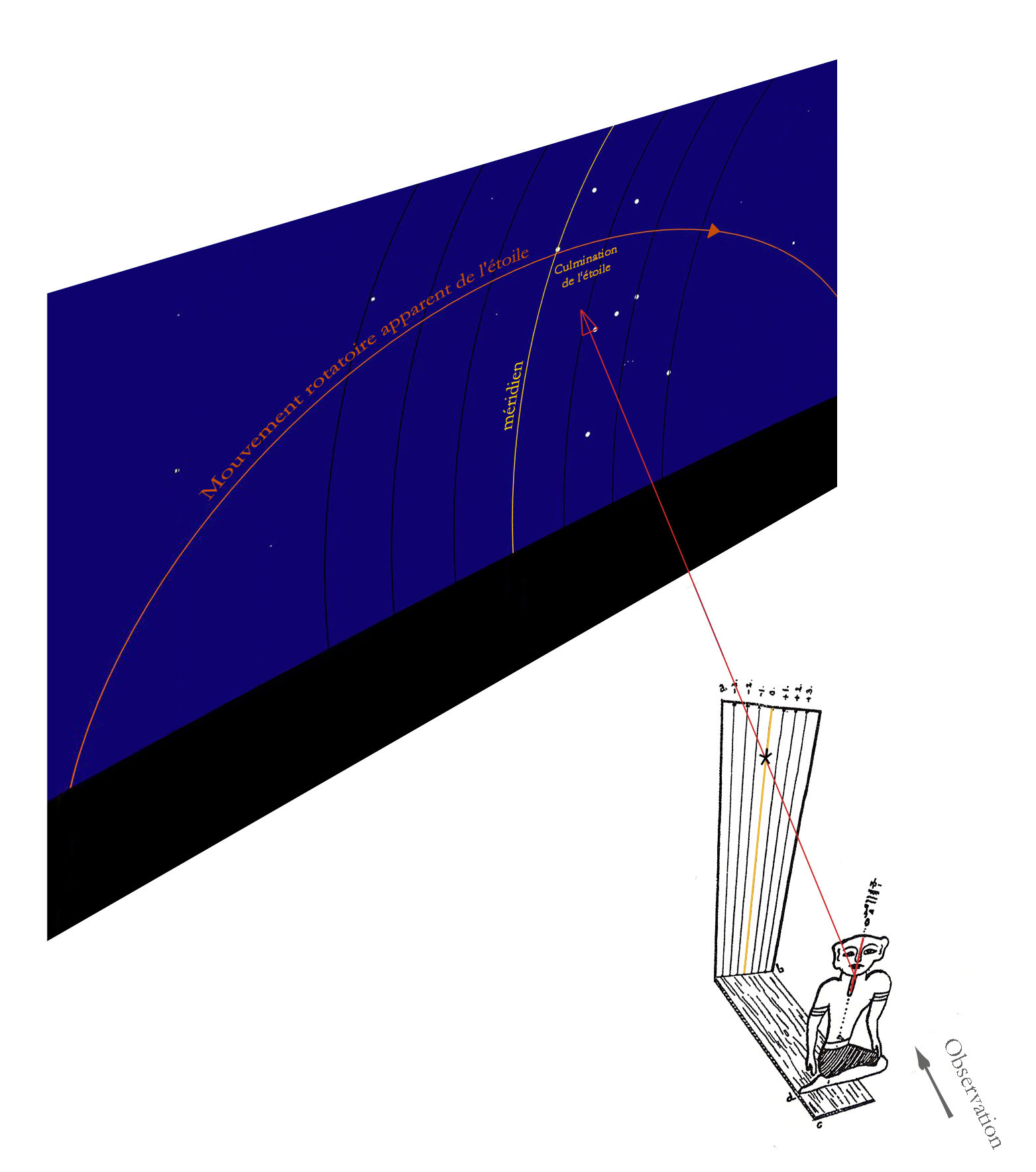
Method of observation of culminations in ancient Egypt

In observational astronomy, culmination is the passage of a celestial object (such as the Sun, the Moon, a planet, a star, constellation or a deep-sky object) across the observer's local meridian. These events are also known as meridian transits, used in timekeeping and navigation, and measured precisely using a transit telescope.

During each day, every celestial object appears to move along a nearly circular path on the celestial sphere due to the Earth's rotation creating two moments when it crosses the meridian. Except at the geographic poles, any celestial object passing through the meridian has an upper culmination, when it comes very near its highest point (the moment when it is nearest to the zenith), and nearly twelve hours later, is followed by a lower culmination, when it comes very near its lowest point (nearest to the nadir). The time of culmination (when the object culminates) is often used to mean upper culmination.

An object's altitude (A) in degrees at its upper culmination is equal to 90 minus the observer's latitude (L) plus the object's declination (δ):

A = 90° − L + δ.

This equation is the basis for the meridian altitude method for latitude determination.

== Cases ==
Three cases are dependent on the observer's latitude (L) and the declination (δ) of the celestial object:

- The object is above the horizon even at its lower culmination; i.e. if | δ + L | > 90° (i.e. if in absolute value the declination is more than the colatitude, in the corresponding hemisphere)
- The object is below the horizon even at its upper culmination; i.e. if | δ − L | > 90° (i.e. if in absolute value the declination is more than the colatitude, in the opposite hemisphere)
- The upper culmination is above and the lower below the horizon, so the body is observed to rise and set daily; in the other cases (i.e. if in absolute value the declination is less than the colatitude)

The third case applies for objects in a part of the full sky equal to the cosine of the latitude (at the equator it applies for all objects, because the sky turns around the horizontal north–south line; at the poles it applies for none, because the sky turns around the vertical line). The first and second case each apply for half of the remaining sky.

== Period of time ==
The period between a culmination and the next is a sidereal day, which is exactly 24 sidereal hours and 4 minutes less than 24 common solar hours, while the period between an upper culmination and a lower one is 12 sidereal hours. The period between successive day to day (rotational) culminations is effected mainly by Earth's orbital proper motion, which produces the different lengths between the solar day (the interval between culminations of the Sun) and the sidereal day (the interval between culminations of any reference star) or the slightly more precise, precession unaffected, stellar day. This results in culminations occurring every solar day at different times, taking a sidereal year (366.3 days), a year that is one day longer than the solar year, for a culmination to reoccur. Therefore, only once every 366.3 solar days the culmination reoccurs at the same time of a solar day, while reoccurring every sidereal day. The remaining small changes in the culmination period time from sidereal year to sidereal year is on the other hand mainly caused by nutation (with a 18.6 years cycle), resulting in the longer time scale axial precession of Earth (with a 26,000 years cycle), while apsidal precession and other mechanics have a much smaller impact on sidereal observation, impacting Earth's climate through the Milankovitch cycles significantly more. Though at such timescales stars themself change position, particularly those stars which have, as viewed from the Solar System, a high proper motion.

Stellar parallax appears to be a similar motion like all these apparent movements, but has only from non-averaged sidereal day to sidereal day a slight effect, returning to its original apparent position, completing a cycle every orbit, with a slight additional lasting change to the position due to the precessions. This phenomenon results from Earth changing position on its orbital path.

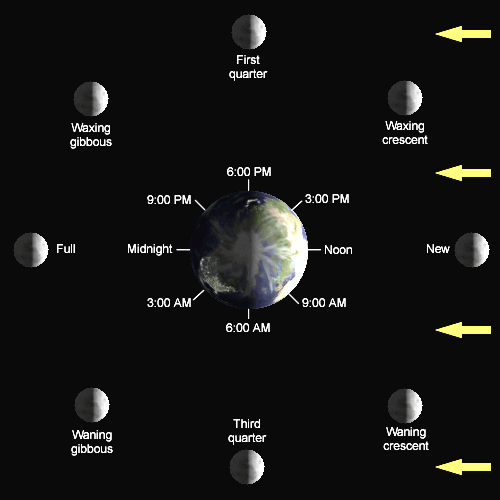
The time of day at a location on Earth (except at the poles) can be inferred from the culmination of the Moon in the sky and its phase: each lunar phase culminates closest to the zenith (being exactly south or north of it, crossing the meridian) in the sky at a specific daytime, as marked in the diagram, rising (east) and setting (west) during the time of the day preceding and succeeding the culmination.

== The Sun ==
From the tropics and middle latitudes, the Sun is visible in the sky at its upper culmination (at solar noon) and invisible (below the horizon) at its lower culmination (at solar midnight). When viewed from the region within either polar circle around the winter solstice of that hemisphere (the December solstice in the Arctic and the June solstice in the Antarctic), the Sun is below the horizon at both of its culminations.

Earth's subsolar point occurs at the point where the upper culmination of the Sun reaches the point's zenith. At this point, which moves around the tropics throughout the year, the Sun is perceived to be directly overhead.

We apply the previous equation, A = 90° − L + δ, in the following examples.

Supposing that the declination of the Sun is +20° when it crosses the local meridian, then the complementary angle of 70° (from the Sun to the pole) is added to and subtracted from the observer's latitude to find the solar altitudes at upper and lower culminations, respectively.

- From 52° north, the upper culmination is at 58° above the horizon due south, while the lower is at 18° below the horizon due north. This is calculated as 52° + 70° = 122° (the supplementary angle being 58°) for the upper, and 52° − 70° = −18° for the lower.
- From 80° north, the upper culmination is at 30° above the horizon due south, while the lower is at 10° above the horizon (midnight sun) due north.

== Circumpolar stars ==
From most of the Northern Hemisphere, Polaris (the North Star) and the other stars of the constellation Ursa Minor circles counterclockwise around the north celestial pole and remain visible at both culminations (as long as the sky is clear and dark enough). In the Southern Hemisphere there is no bright pole star, but the constellation Octans circles clockwise around the south celestial pole and remains visible at both culminations.

Any astronomical objects that always remain above the local horizon, as viewed from the observer's latitude, are described as circumpolar.

== See also ==
- Celestial sphere
- Meridian (astronomy)
- Nadir
- Satellite pass
- Star transit
- Zenith
