= Subsolar point =

Point which the sun is directly overhead

The subsolar point at Honolulu during Lahaina Noon with the range of possible subsolar points shaded in pink – the angle between the Sun and the local horizontal level is exactly 90° at the subsolar point

The subsolar point on a planet or a moon is the point at which its Sun is perceived to be directly overhead (at the zenith); that is, where the Sun's rays strike the planet exactly perpendicular to its surface. The subsolar point occurs at the location on a planet or a moon where the Sun culminates at the location's zenith. This occurs at solar noon. At this point, the Sun's rays will fall exactly vertical relative to an object on the ground and thus cast no observable shadow.

To an observer on a planet with an orientation and rotation similar to those of Earth, the subsolar point will appear to move westward with a speed of 1600 km/h, completing one circuit around the globe each day, approximately moving along the equator. However, it will also move north and south between the tropics over the course of a year, so will appear to spiral like a helix.

The term subsolar point can also mean the point closest to the Sun on an astronomical object, even though the Sun might not be visible.

== On Earth ==
On this azimuthal equidistant projection centred on Mecca, when the subsolar point is on the Ka'bah, shadows of vertical poles on the sunlit hemisphere point away from it

On Earth, the subsolar point only occurs within the tropics. The subsolar point contacts the Tropic of Cancer on the June solstice and the Tropic of Capricorn on the December solstice. The subsolar point crosses the Equator on the March and September equinoxes.

=== Coordinates of the subsolar point ===
The subsolar point moves constantly on the surface of the Earth, but for any given time, its coordinates, or latitude and longitude, can be calculated as follows:

$$\phi_{s} = \delta,$$
$$\lambda_{s} = -15(T_\mathrm{GMT}-12+E_\mathrm{min}/60).$$

where

- $\phi_{s}$ is the latitude of the subsolar point in degrees,
- $\lambda_{s}$ is the longitude of the subsolar point in degrees,
- $\delta$ is the declination of the Sun in degrees,
- $T_\mathrm{GMT}$ is the Greenwich Mean Time or UTC, in decimal hours since 00:00:00 UTC on the relevant date
- $E_\mathrm{min}$ is the equation of time in minutes.

=== Dates ===
Approximate subsolar point dates vs. latitude superimposed on a world map, the example in blue denoting Lahaina Noon in Honolulu.

=== Specific observations ===
- Qibla observation by shadows, when the subsolar point passes through the Ka'bah in Saudi Arabia, allowing the Muslim sacred direction to be found by observing shadows.
- Lahaina Noon, when the point passes through Hawaii, which is the only U.S. state in which this happens.

== See also ==
- Subsatellite point
