= Tropics =

Region of Earth surrounding the Equator

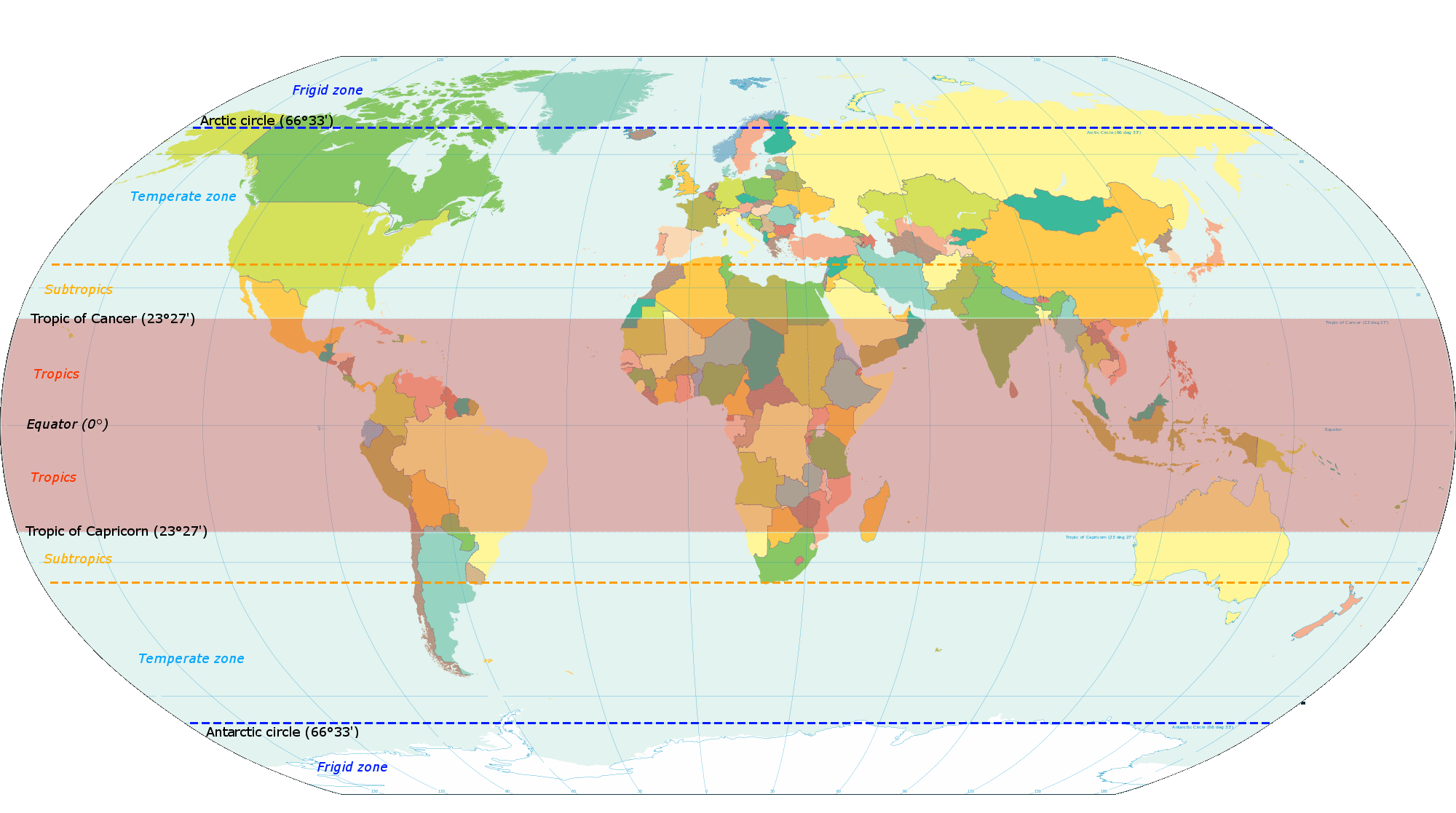
World map with the intertropical zone highlighted in crimson

Areas of the world with tropical climates. Af (tropical rainforest climate) Am (tropical monsoon climate) Aw/As (tropical savanna climate)

The tropics are the region of Earth surrounding the equator, where the Sun may shine directly overhead. This contrasts with the temperate or polar regions of Earth, where the Sun can never be directly overhead. Because of Earth's axial tilt, the width of the tropics (in latitude) is twice the tilt. The tropics are also referred to as the tropical zone and the torrid zone (see geographical zone).

Due to the sun's high angle throughout the year, the tropics receive the most solar energy over the course of the year, and consequently have the highest temperatures on the planet. Even when not directly overhead, the sun is still close to overhead throughout the year, therefore the tropics also have the lowest seasonal variation on the planet; "winter" and "summer" lose their temperature contrast. Instead, seasons are more commonly divided by precipitation variations than by temperature variations or daylight hours.

The tropics maintain wide diversity of local climates, such as rain forests, monsoons, savannahs, deserts, and high altitude snow-capped mountains. The word "tropical" can specifically refer to certain kinds of weather, rather than to the geographic region; these usages ought not be confused.

The Earth's axial tilt is currently around 23.4°, and therefore so are the latitudes of the tropical circles, marking the boundary of the tropics: specifically, ±23°26′08.9″ (or 23.4358°). The northern one is called the Tropic of Cancer, and the southern is the Tropic of Capricorn. As the Earth's axial tilt changes, (Note: Currently −0.013° per hundred years.) so too do the tropical and polar circles.

The tropics constitute 39.8% of Earth's surface area and contain 36% of Earth's landmass. As of 2014, the region was home also to 40% of the world's population, and this figure was then projected to reach 50% by 2050. Because of global warming, the weather conditions of the tropics are expanding with areas in the subtropics, having more extreme weather events such as heatwaves and more intense storms. These changes in weather conditions may make certain parts of the tropics uninhabitable.

== Etymology ==
The word "tropic" comes via Latin from Ancient Greek τροπή (tropē), meaning "to turn" or "change direction". This lent to the marginal parallels where the Sun would be highest overhead as the Earth tilts while still facing the Sun the most, at certain times of the year: the Tropic of Cancer was the parallel where the Sun's position was at its highest during summer in the Northern Hemisphere against where constellation Cancer formerly had been measured as far back in Mesopotamia c. 2500 BC, and the Tropic of Capricorn is the inverse during winter there while highest in the Southern Hemisphere measured as where Capricorn formerly would have been; this is no longer the case due to the precession of the equinoxes where overhead positions now lay against the backdrop of Taurus and Sagittarius respectively.

== Astronomical definition ==
Relationship of Earth's axial tilt (ε) to the tropical and polar circles: the Tropic of Cancer is a subsolar point only at the June solstice, and the Tropic of Capricorn is only at the December solstice

The tropics are defined as the region between the Tropic of Cancer in the Northern Hemisphere at 23°26′08.9″ (or 23.4358°) N and the Tropic of Capricorn in the Southern Hemisphere at 23°26′08.9″ (or 23.4358°) S; these latitudes correspond to the axial tilt of the Earth.

The Tropic of Cancer is the Northernmost latitude from which the Sun can ever be seen directly overhead, and the Tropic of Capricorn is the Southernmost. This means that the tropical zone includes everywhere on Earth which is a subsolar point at least once during the solar year. Thus the maximum latitudes of the tropics have equal distances from the equator on either side. Likewise, they approximate the angle of the Earth's axial tilt. This angle is not perfectly fixed, mainly due to the influence of the moon, but the limits of the tropics are a geographic convention, and their variance from the true latitudes is very small.

== Seasons and climate ==
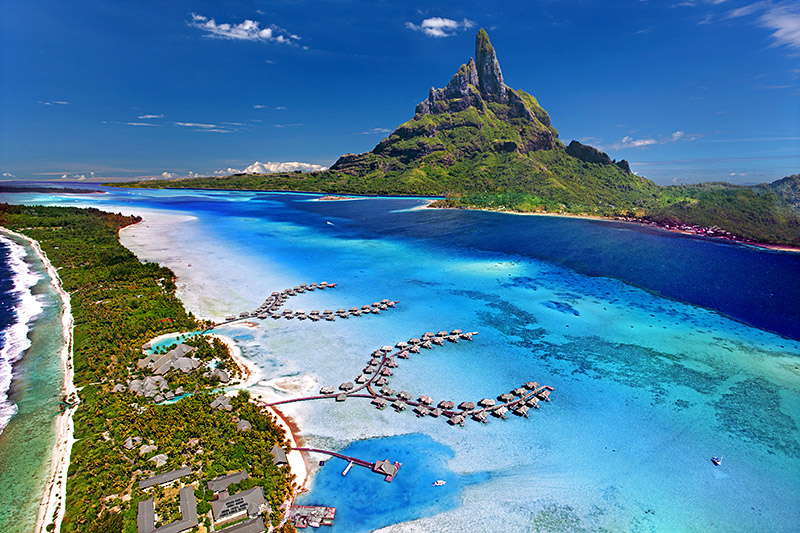
Aerial view of Bora Bora in French Polynesia

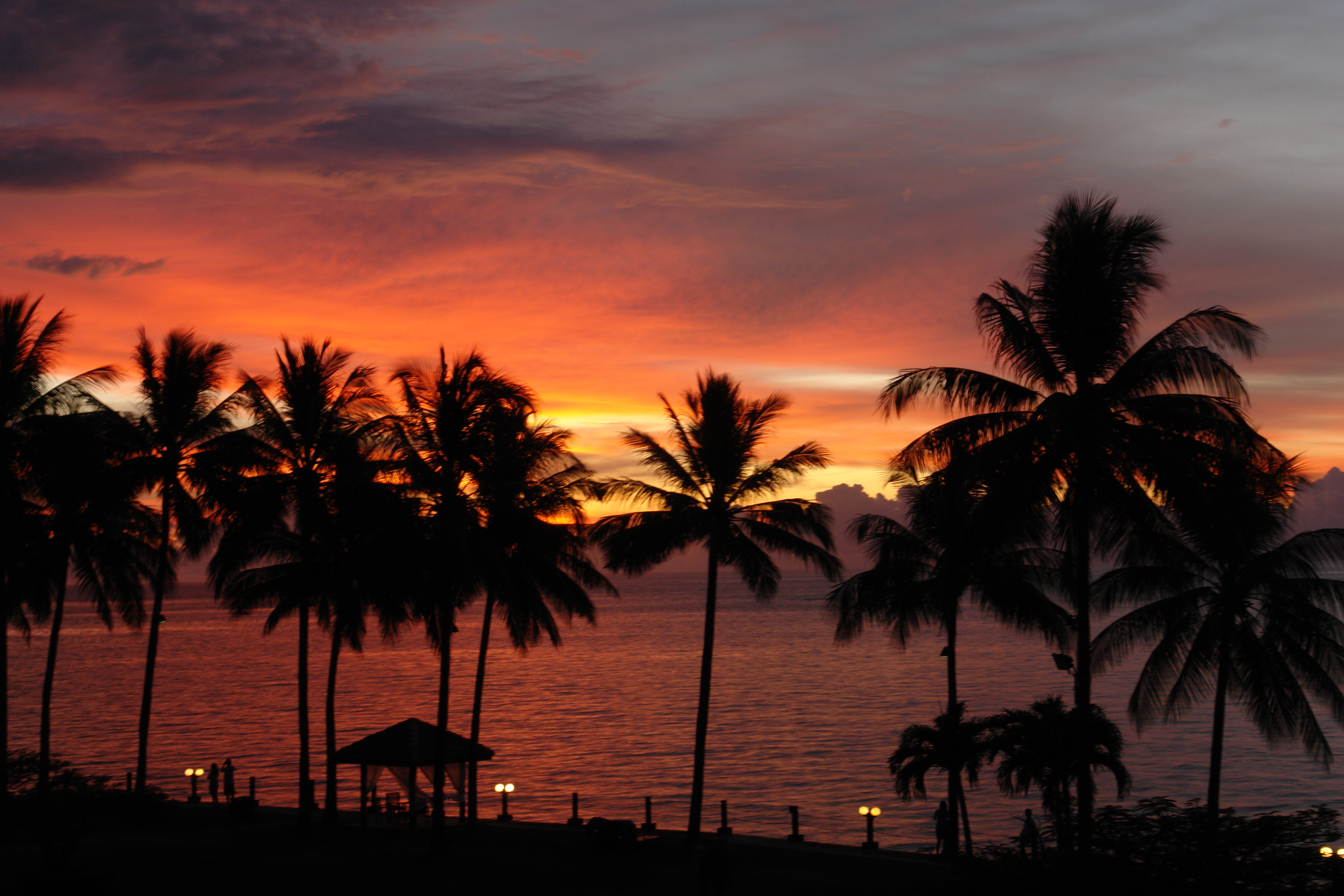
Tropical sunset over the sea in Kota Kinabalu in Malaysia

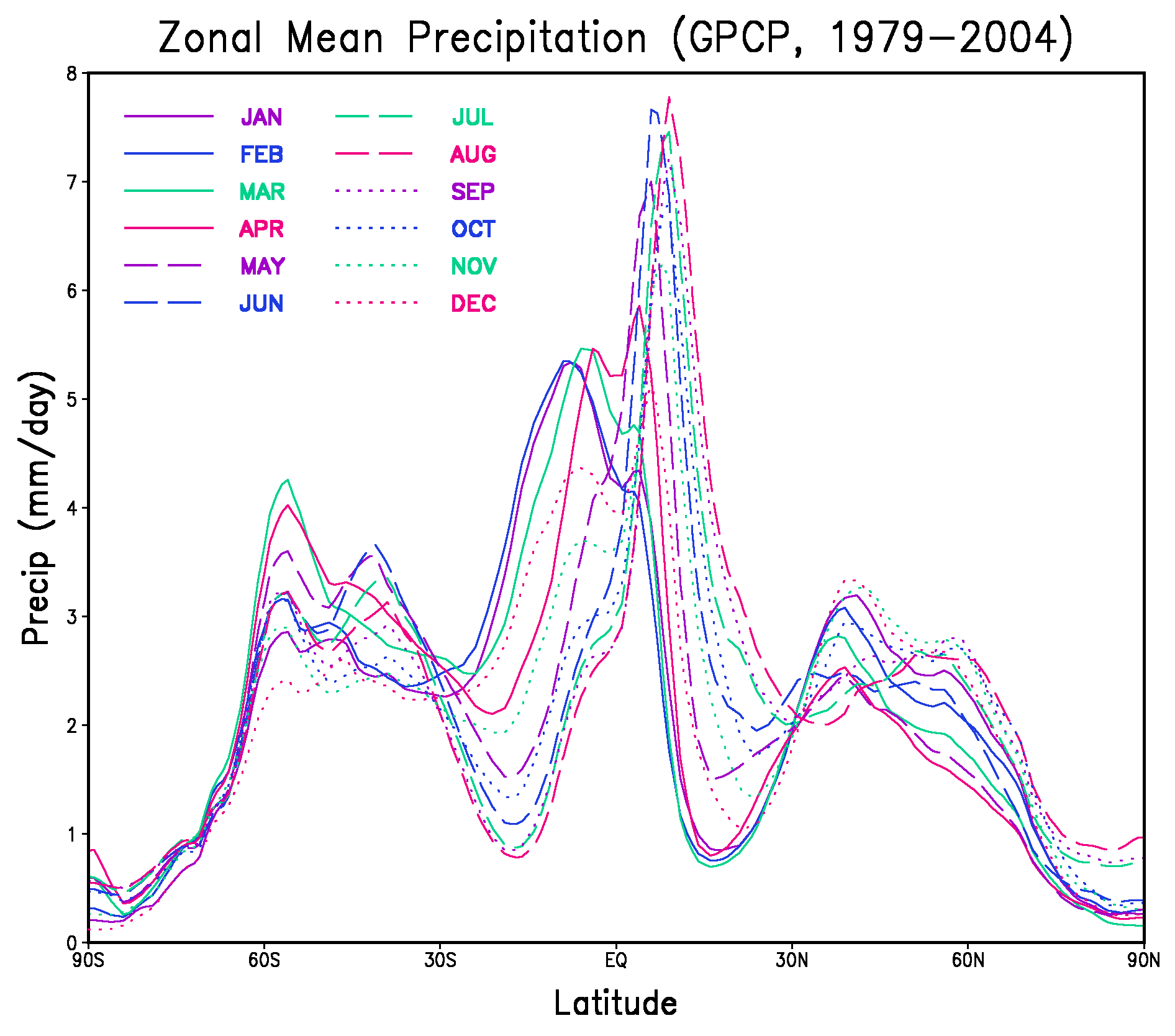
Graph showing the zonally averaged monthly precipitation. The tropics receive more precipitation than higher latitudes. The precipitation maximum, which follows the solar equator through the year, is under the rising branch of the Hadley circulation. The sub-tropical minima are under the descending branch and cause the formation of desert areas.

Many tropical areas have both a dry and a wet season. The wet season, rainy season or green season is the time of year, ranging from one or more months when most of the average annual rainfall in a region falls. Typical vegetation in these areas ranges from moist seasonal tropical forests to savannas.

Areas with wet seasons are disseminated across portions of the tropics and subtropics, some even in temperate regions. Under the Köppen climate classification, for tropical climates, a wet-season month is defined as one or more months where average precipitation is 60 mm (2.4 in) or more. Some areas with pronounced rainy seasons see a break in rainfall during mid-season when the Intertropical Convergence Zone or monsoon trough moves poleward of their location during the middle of the warm season;

The wet season takes place on warmer months, where precipitation falls mainly during the late afternoon and early evening hours. The wet season is a time when air quality improves, freshwater quality improves and vegetation grows significantly due to the wet season supplementing flora, leading to crop yields late in the season. Floods and rains cause rivers to overflow their banks, and some animals to retreat to higher ground. Soil nutrients are washed away and erosion increases. The incidence of malaria increases in areas where the rainy season coincides with high temperatures. Animals have adaptation and survival strategies for the wetter regime. The previous dry season leads to food shortages into the wet season, as the crops have yet to mature.

However, regions within the tropics may well not have a tropical climate. Under the Köppen climate classification, much of the area within the geographical tropics is classed not as "tropical" but as "dry" (arid or semi-arid), including the Sahara Desert, the Atacama Desert and the Outback. Also, there are alpine tundra and snow-capped peaks, including Mauna Kea, Mount Kilimanjaro, Puncak Jaya and the Andes as far south as the northernmost parts of Chile and Peru.

=== Climate change ===
The climate is changing in the tropics, as it is in the rest of the world. The effects of steadily rising concentrations of greenhouse gases on the climate may be less obvious to tropical residents, however, because they are overlain by considerable natural variability. Much of this variability is driven by the El Niño-Southern Oscillation (ENSO). The Tropics has warmed by 0.7–0.8 °C over the last century—only slightly less than the global average—but a strong El Niño made 1998 the warmest year in most areas, with no significant warming since. Climate models predict a further 1–2 °C warming by 2050 and 1–4 °C by 2100.

== Ecosystems ==
Distribution of subtropical and tropical wet forests

Tropical plants and animals are those species native to the tropics. Tropical ecosystems may consist of tropical rainforests, seasonal tropical forests, dry (often deciduous) forests, spiny forests, deserts, savannahs, grasslands and other habitat types. There are often wide areas of biodiversity, and species endemism present, particularly in rainforests and seasonal forests. Some examples of important biodiversity and high-endemism ecosystems are El Yunque National Forest in Puerto Rico, Costa Rican and Nicaraguan rainforests, Amazon rainforest territories of several South American countries, Madagascar dry deciduous forests, the Waterberg Biosphere of South Africa, and eastern Madagascar rainforests. Often the soils of tropical forests are low in nutrient content, making them quite vulnerable to slash-and-burn deforestation techniques, which are sometimes an element of shifting cultivation agricultural systems.

In biogeography, the tropics are divided into Paleotropics (Africa, Asia and Australia) and Neotropics (Caribbean, Central America, and South America). Together, they are sometimes referred to as the Pantropic. The system of biogeographic realms differs somewhat; the Neotropical realm includes both the Neotropics and temperate South America, and the Paleotropics correspond to the Afrotropical, Indomalayan, Oceanian, and tropical Australasian realms.

== Flora ==
Flora are plants found in a specific region at a specific time. Some well-known plants that are exclusively found in, originate from, or are often associated with the tropics include:

- Bamboo
- Banana trees
- Citrus fruits such as oranges, lemons, mandarins, etc.
- Coconut trees
- Coffee
- Dragon fruit
- Ferns
- Jackfruit
- Orchids
- Palm trees
- Papaya trees
- Rubber tree
- Stone fruits such as mangos, avocado, sapote etc.
- Bird of paradise flower
- Cacao
- Giant water lily
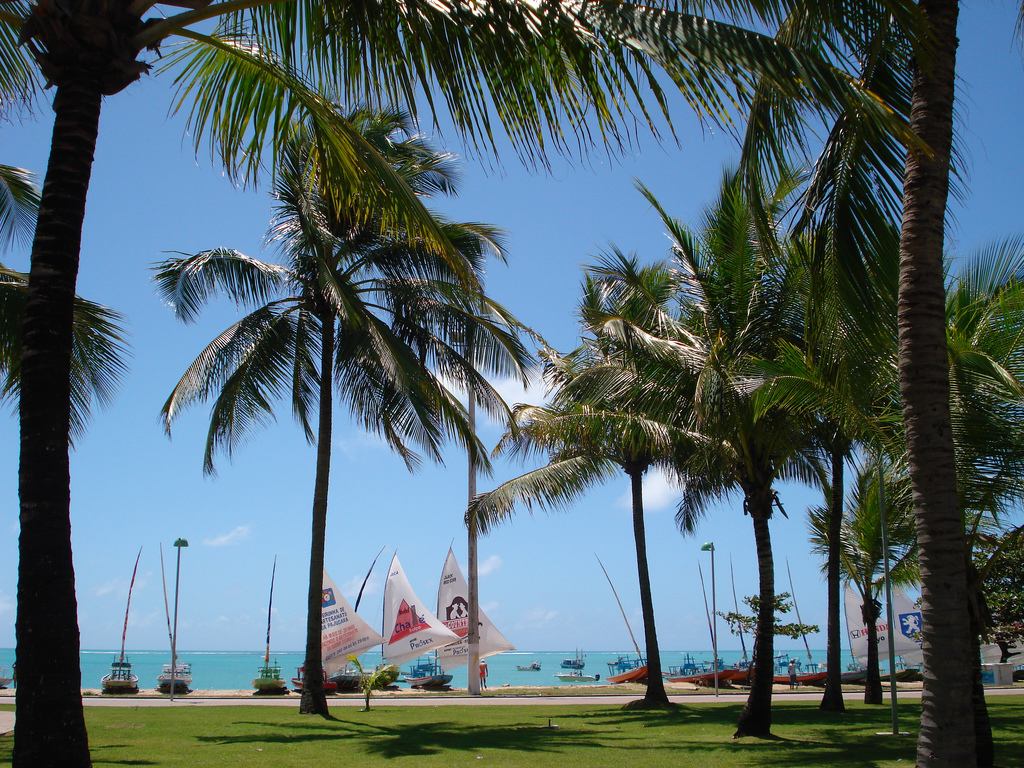
Coconut palms in the warm, tropical climate of Pajuçara in northern Brazil

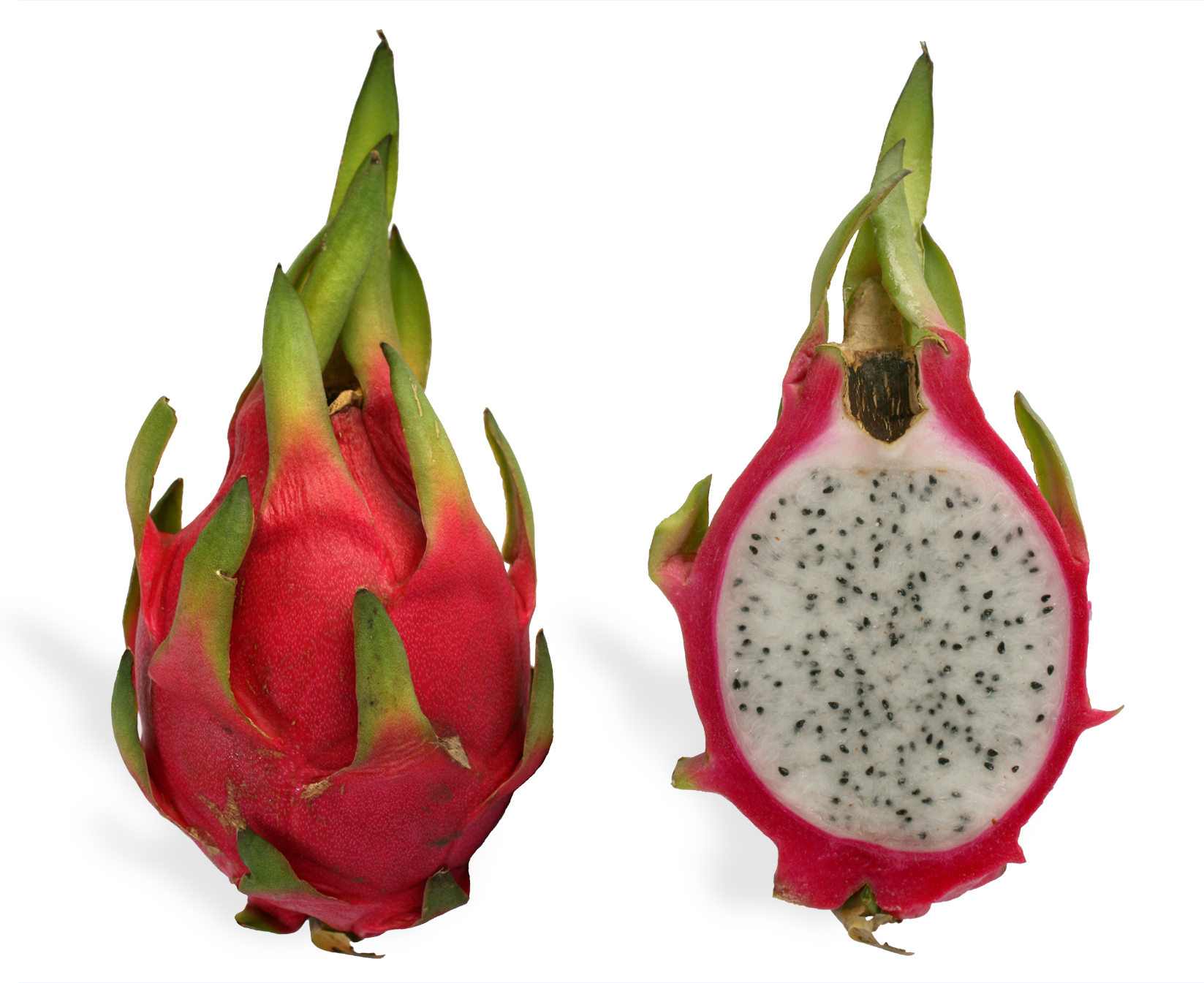
Dragon fruit, a tropical fruit from several different cacti originally from the Americas

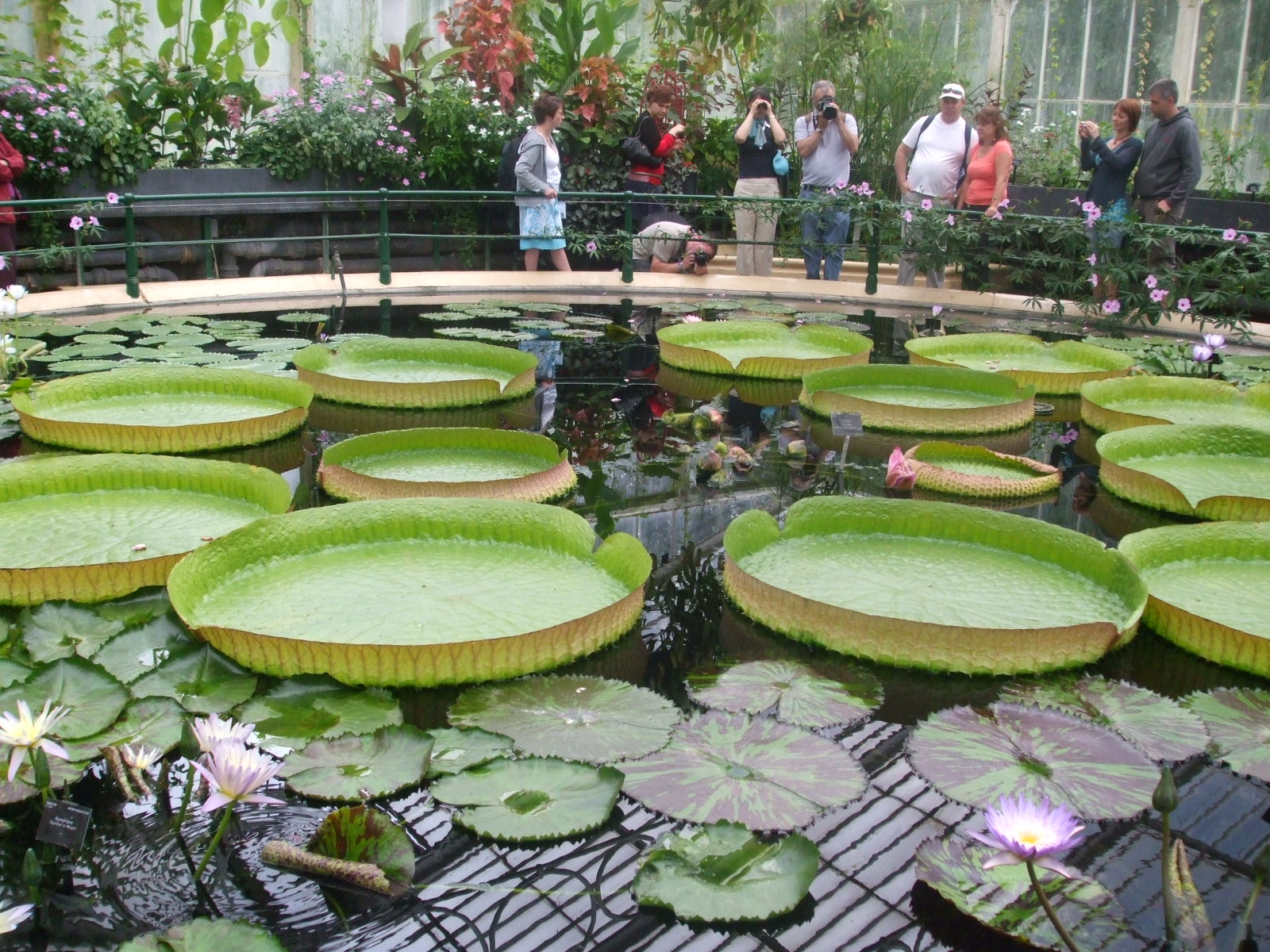
A Giant Water Lily, one of which can support up to 32 kilograms of weight

== Tropicality ==
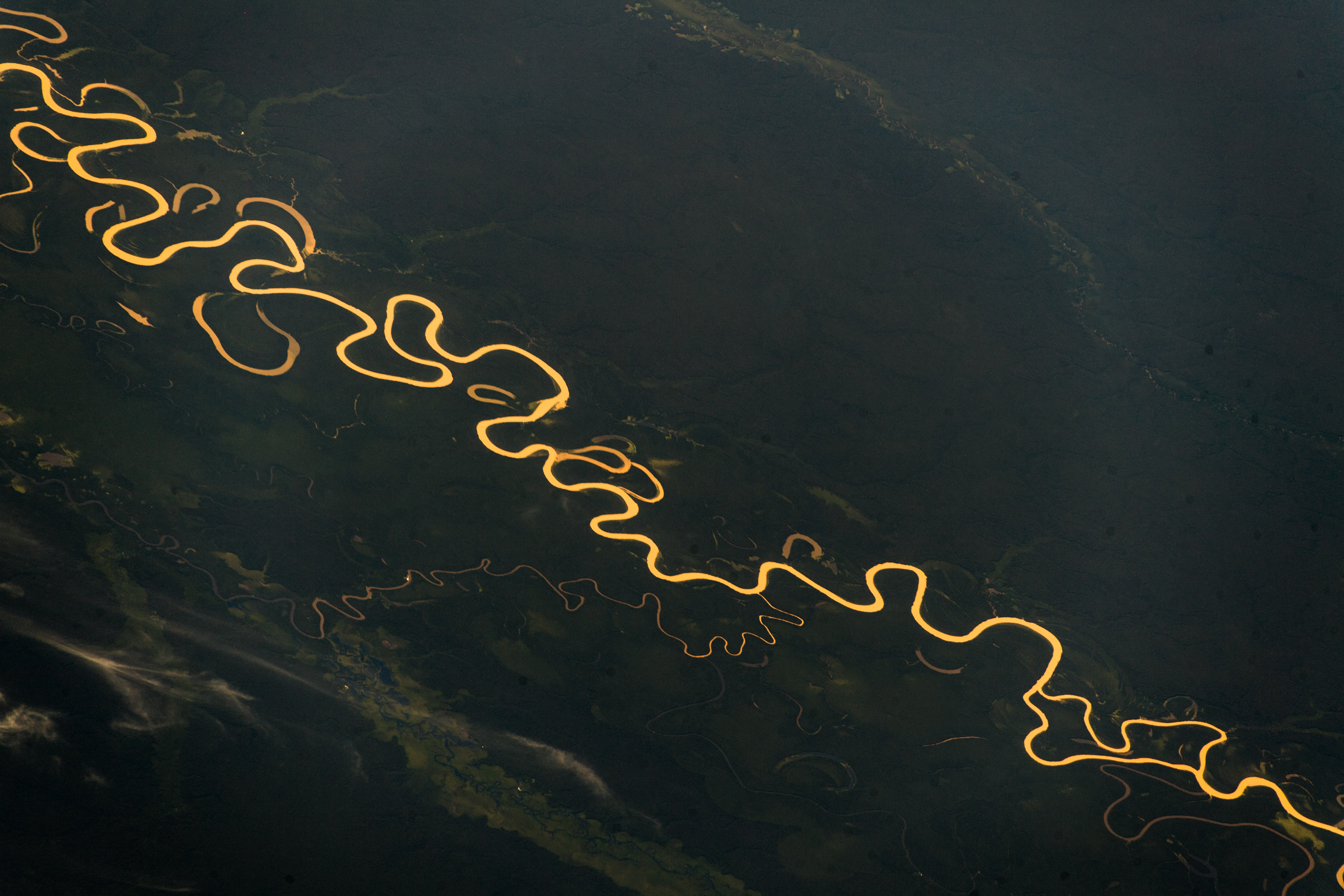
Juruá River surrounded by the dense Amazon rainforest, which is home to uncontacted tribes to this day

Tropicality refers to the image of the tropics that people from outside the tropics have of the region, ranging from critical to verging on fetishism. Tropicality gained renewed interest in geographical discourse when French geographer Pierre Gourou published Les pays tropicaux (The Tropical World in English), in the late 1940s.

Tropicality encompassed two major images. One, is that the tropics represent a 'Garden of Eden', a heaven on Earth, a land of rich biodiversity or a tropical paradise. The alternative is that the tropics consist of wild, unconquerable nature. The latter view was often discussed in old Western literature more so than the first. Evidence suggests over time that the view of the tropics as such in popular literature has been supplanted by more well-rounded and well-informed interpretations.

Western scholars tried to theorise why tropical areas were relatively more inhospitable to human civilisations than colder regions of the Northern Hemisphere. A popular explanation focused on the differences in climate. Tropical jungles and rainforests have much more humid and hotter weather than colder and drier temperaments of the Northern Hemisphere, giving to a more diverse biosphere. This theme led some scholars to suggest that humid hot climates correlate to human populations lacking control over nature e.g. 'the wild Amazonian rainforests'.

== See also ==
- Hardiness zone
- Lahaina Noon
- Tropical ecology
- Tropical marine climate
- Tropical year
- Tropical medicine
- Polar circle
