= Zenith =

Imaginary point directly above a particular location, on the imaginary celestial sphere

Diagram showing the relationship between the zenith, the nadir, and different types of horizon

The zenith (UK: /ˈzɛnɪθ/, US: /ˈziː-/) is the imaginary point on the celestial sphere directly "above" a particular location. "Above" means in the vertical direction (plumb line) opposite to the gravity direction at that location (nadir). The zenith is the "highest" point on the celestial sphere. The direction opposite of the zenith is the nadir.

== Origin ==
The word zenith derives from an inaccurate reading of the Arabic expression سمت الرأس (samt al-raʾs), meaning "direction of the head" or "path above the head", by Medieval Latin scribes in the Middle Ages (during the 14th century), possibly through Old Spanish. It was reduced to samt ("direction") and miswritten as senit/cenit, the m being misread as ni. Through the Old French cenith, zenith first appeared in the 17th century.

== Relevance and use ==
Angles and planes of a celestial sphere

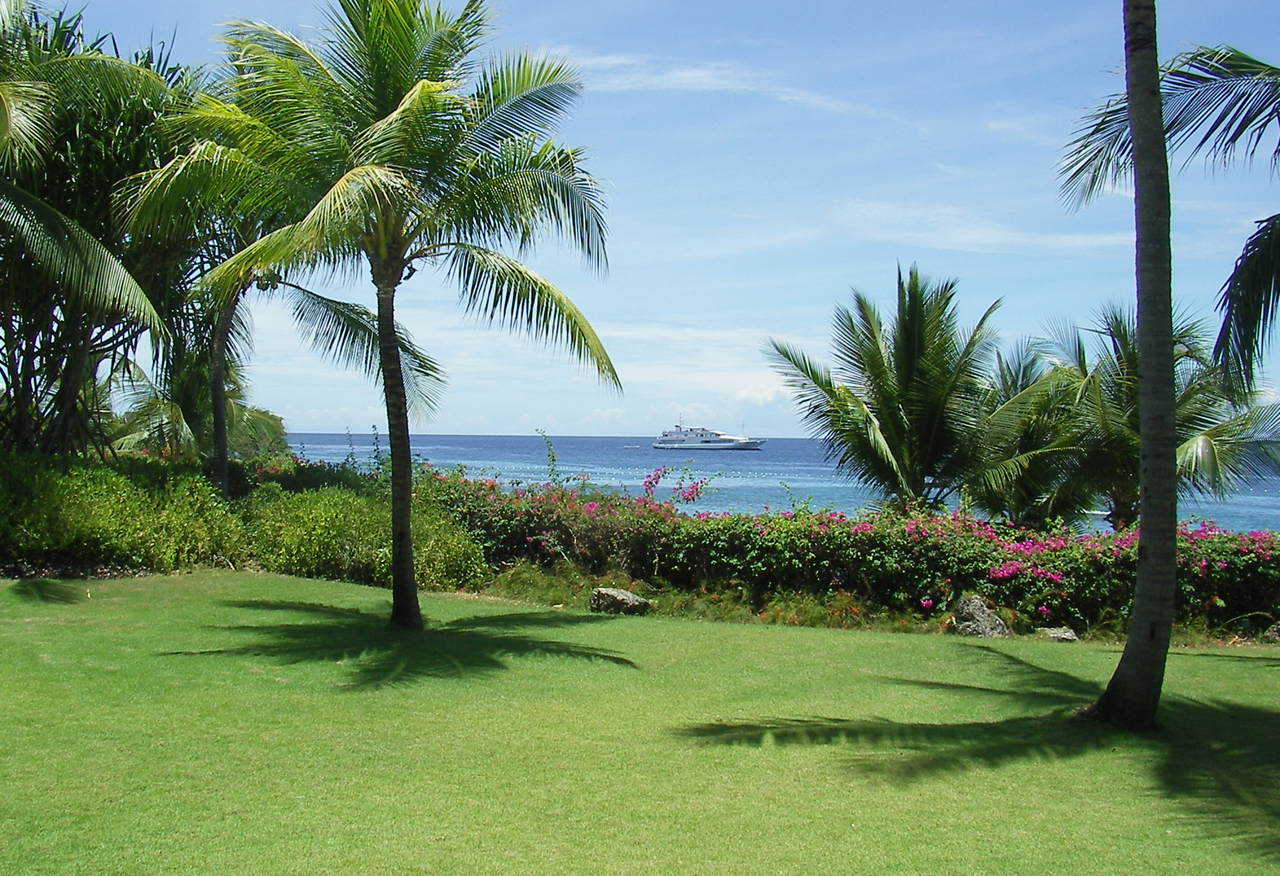
The shadows of trees are the shortest on Earth when the Sun is directly overhead (at the zenith). This happens only at solar noon on certain days in the tropics, where the trees' latitude and the Sun's declination are equal.

The term zenith sometimes means the highest point, way, or level reached by a celestial body on its daily apparent path around a given point of observation. This sense of the word is often used to describe the position of the Sun ("The sun reached its zenith..."), but to an astronomer, the Sun does not have its own zenith and is at the zenith only if it is directly overhead.

In a scientific context, the zenith is the direction of reference for measuring the zenith angle (or zenith angular distance), the angle between a direction of interest (e.g. a star) and the local zenith - that is, the complement of the altitude angle (or elevation angle).

The Sun reaches the observer's zenith when it is 90° above the horizon, and this only happens between the Tropic of Cancer and the Tropic of Capricorn. The point where this occurs is known as the subsolar point. In Islamic astronomy, the passing of the Sun over the zenith of Mecca becomes the basis of the qibla observation by shadows twice a year on 27/28 May and 15/16 July.

At a given location during the course of a day, the Sun reaches not only its zenith but also its nadir, at the antipode of that location 12 hours from solar noon.

In astronomy, the altitude in the horizontal coordinate system and the zenith angle are complementary angles, with the horizon perpendicular to the zenith. The astronomical meridian is also determined by the zenith, and is defined as a circle on the celestial sphere that passes through the zenith, nadir, and the celestial poles.

A zenith telescope is a type of telescope designed to point straight up at or near the zenith, and used for precision measurement of star positions, to simplify telescope construction, or both. The NASA Orbital Debris Observatory and the Large Zenith Telescope are both zenith telescopes, since the use of liquid mirrors meant these telescopes could only point straight up.

On the International Space Station, zenith and nadir are used instead of up and down, referring to directions within and around the station, relative to the earth.

=== Zenith star ===
Gamma Draconis (circled), with a declination of +51° 29′ 20″, is the zenith star of London.

Zenith stars (also "star on top", "overhead star", "latitude star") are stars whose declination equals the latitude of the observers location, and hence at some time in the day or night pass culminate (pass) through the zenith. When at the zenith the right ascension of the star equals the local sidereal time at your location. In celestial navigation this allows latitude to be determined, since the declination of the star equals the latitude of the observer. If the current time at Greenwich is known at the time of the observation, the observers longitude can also be determined from the right ascension of the star. Hence "Zenith stars" lie on or near the circle of declination equal to the latitude of the observer ("zenith circle"). Zenith stars are not to be confused with "steering stars" of a sidereal compass rose of a sidereal compass.

== See also ==
Media related to Zenith (topography) at Wikimedia Commons

- Analemma
- Azimuth
- Geodesy
- History of geodesy
- Horizon zenith angle
- Horizontal coordinate system
- Keyhole problem
- Vertical deflection
