= TV advertising platform =

Platforms and technologies used to buy, sell and measure television advertising

A TV advertising platform is a system, service or suite of tools used to plan, buy, deliver and measure advertising on television and television-like screens – including traditional broadcast and cable, addressable set-top advertising, and internet-connected television (connected TV, or CTV). These platforms combine marketplace functions, ad-delivery technology, and measurement to enable transactions between advertisers, agencies, and content distributors, and to provide marketers with a single place to manage campaign planning, targeting, execution, and reporting.

== History ==
The industry evolved from manual buys and linear broadcast systems to addressable and programmatic functions as broadband-connected devices and streaming services grew. The emergence of OTT/CTV in the 2010s accelerated demand for digital-style targeting and automated buying on the TV screen; industry bodies and vendors published technical and measurement guidance to support this transition. Recent industry reports show accelerating marketer allocation to OTT/CTV budgets.

== Structure and function ==
TV ad platforms perform several core functions: they aggregate inventory (from broadcasters, MVPDs and streaming publishers), provide planning and buying interfaces (self-serve or managed), execute ad delivery (often via SSAI for seamless playback), and collect performance and verification data (viewability, ACR, conversions, MMM readiness). Because audiences are increasingly fragmented across linear and streaming, platforms that unify buying and reporting across screens reduce operational complexity and help advertisers reach target viewers more efficiently. Platforms also help address privacy and compliance challenges by enabling first-party data strategies and privacy-forward targeting functions.

=== Benefits ===
TV ad platforms let advertisers plan and execute coherent campaigns across both linear and streaming inventory, removing the need for multiple direct deals or fragmented workflows. By combining unified reach with advanced measurement and attribution, these platforms make TV more accountable to performance goals: real-time optimization (creative swaps, pacing and budget reallocation) lets marketers react to live signals and iterate quickly, narrowing the gap between TV and digital performance expectations.

At the same time, modern platforms help address privacy and technical challenges. They support first-party and privacy-compliant targeting as third-party cookies and regulations reduce reliance on external identifiers, and use server-level delivery techniques (like SSAI) to ensure seamless ad playback, reduce buffering/ad-blocking issues, and provide more consistent measurement across devices.

== Usage ==
TV advertising platforms are used by a range of organizations that require coordinated planning, buying and measurement across television and streaming channels. Typical users include brand advertisers seeking broad reach and premium placements (for example, live events and tentpole programming); direct-to-consumer and performance-focused marketers who require scalable, measurable acquisition channels; mobile and app marketers using broadcast and streaming exposure to drive installs and re-engagement; and advertising agencies that manage cross-client campaigns and benefit from centralized inventory access and consolidated reporting.

When evaluating a platform, stakeholders typically assess commercial, inventory, measurement and technical factors. Commercial considerations include minimum spend requirements and pricing models (CPM, dynamic pricing or managed-service fees). Inventory considerations cover whether a platform supports linear and streaming supply or is limited to specific publishers or walled gardens.

Measurement capabilities should be examined to determine support for TV-native metrics (reach and frequency, media-mix modelling, cross-platform attribution) rather than relying solely on digital proxies. Buying flexibility (direct guaranteed buys versus programmatic access and private marketplaces) affects control, transparency and scale. Finally, technical features—such as SSAI support, creative specifications for CTV, viewability and verification integrations, and compatibility with identity or measurement partners—are important for operational integration and consistent reporting.

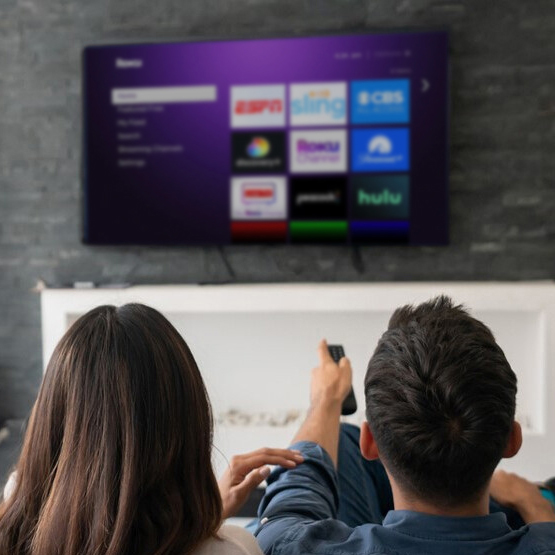
TV advertising platform

== Types of TV advertising platforms ==
- TV publisher ad platforms. Publishers have created ad platforms, also known as ad managers or campaign managers, for purchasing their owned and operated inventory. These platforms allow an advertiser to choose your budget and target an audience, and measure impressions.
- Programmatic CTV ad platforms. While they are not specifically TV ad platforms, many demand side platforms (DSPs) can access streaming or CTV ad inventory through programmatic buying. Separately, many tv ad platforms buy from DSPs or white label their technology while adding proprietary dashboards, features, and creative tools. These platforms do not offer other types of TV ad inventory and can only access publishers that sell programmatically.
- Convergent TV ad platform. Convergent TV ad platforms allow advertisers to purchase all TV ad inventory (streaming/ctv, linear, and online video). Advertisers can choose a budget, launch a campaign, measure performance and brand objectives, and make optimizations.

== List of TV advertising platforms ==
Platform	Type	Features	Users	Source
Amazon Ads / Amazon DSP	Publisher + DSP / walled-garden + programmatic DSP	Access to Amazon-owned inventory (Freevee, Fire TV) and programmatic DSP capabilities with retail/commerce signals.	Retail advertisers, brands using Amazon retail/first-party signals, agencies.	
Freewheel (Comcast)	Publisher/ad-management & marketplace platform	Publisher-facing ad management, premium programmatic and direct-sold solutions for streaming and linear publishers.	Large broadcasters, MVPDs, and advertisers buying premium publisher inventory.	
Google (Display & Video 360 / DV360)	DSP within Google Marketing Platform	Programmatic buying across YouTube and third-party CTV inventory, audience and measurement integrations.	Agencies and advertisers buying large-scale CTV and video inventory including YouTube.	
Innovid	Creative + ad-serving + measurement platform	Creative personalization, interactive CTV ad formats, cross-platform ad serving and analytics.	Advertisers and agencies focused on creative personalization and measurement.	
Magnite (incl. SpotX)	Supply-side platform (SSP) / publisher monetization	Publisher monetization for CTV/video, programmatic marketplaces and header bidding for OTT/CTV inventory.	Publishers, SSP partners, and buyers seeking programmatic video supply.	
Roku Advertising (OneView / Roku Ads)	Platform + publisher ad offering	Device-scale ad platform with access to Roku inventory, measurement and programmatic options.	Brand advertisers and agencies seeking Roku audience reach and first-party signals.	
Samba TV	ACR-based measurement & analytics / ad platform	TV measurement (ACR), cross-platform attribution, audience analytics and campaign reporting.	Advertisers and measurement teams needing TV viewership insights and attribution.	
Tatari	Convergent TV platform / CTV ad platform	Unified planning, buying, measurement across linear and CTV; built for accountability and ROI for advertisers.	DTC brands, performance marketers, and advertisers testing CTV.	
The Trade Desk	Demand-side platform (DSP) — programmatic CTV buying	Omnichannel DSP with large CTV reach, audience targeting, and programmatic tools for cross-screen buys.	Agencies, brand and performance advertisers using programmatic CTV.	

== Ad inventory purchasing methods ==
Television advertising inventory can be purchased through two main channels: direct sales and programmatic platforms.

- Direct from the publisher or TV network may buy inventory directly from networks through several methods.
- Upfronts are annual commitments made in the spring, typically six to twelve months before ads air. They are the most expensive and least flexible option, allowing advertisers to secure specific programs with guaranteed impressions. If networks fail to deliver the guaranteed audience, they provide compensation in the form of make-goods, also known as Audience Deficiency Units.
- Non-Preemptible (NPE) buys are purchased about one quarter before airing and guarantee that commercials will run as scheduled. These buys usually cover network rotations or syndicated programs and are priced higher than remnant inventory due to the guarantee of 100% clearance.
- Insertion Orders (IOs) are formal agreements outlining the details of an advertising campaign, including schedules, costs, and placements. Insertion orders may be processed manually or through automated systems that connect directly to ad servers.
- Programmatic advertising involves the automated buying and selling of television inventory using data-driven platforms. It allows advertisers to purchase ad spots through real-time bidding rather than direct negotiation. However, programmatic transactions account for a relatively small share of total TV inventory, as high-value programming such as live sports is typically sold directly by networks. Programmatic buying may involve multiple intermediaries, leading to higher costs, reduced transparency, and potential risks related to ad fraud and brand safety.
