= PeakFinder =

Global mountain peak online directory

- Developer: Fabio Soldati
- Release: 2010
- Operating system: Android, iOS
- Type: Geographic information system, augmented reality
- License: Proprietary software
- Website: www.peakfinder.com

PeakFinder is a mobile app for identifying mountains and mountain peaks. The app generates a panoramic view based on the user's location and displays the names of visible mountains. It is available for the Android and iOS operating systems. First released in 2010, the initial version covered the Alps and the western United States. As of 2026, the application includes data for more than one million peaks worldwide. The app was developed by Swiss software engineer Fabio Soldati.

PeakFinder is a paid application. After purchase, it can be used indefinitely on devices associated with the same platform account, and updates are provided free of charge. The application does not display advertising.

Since 2022, PeakFinder has also provided a publicly accessible web-based application programming interface (API) that allows third-party websites to generate mountain panoramas using its data and rendering system.

== History ==
According to developer Fabio Soldati, the idea for PeakFinder originated during a hiking trip in Switzerland in 2010. During a hike with his sister and brother-in-law, the couple had a disagreement over the name of a mountain peak. Although Soldati was not particularly knowledgeable about mountain names, he regarded the identification problem as an interesting technical challenge. After researching available geographic datasets and technologies, he developed the first version of the application in approximately six months.

The application gained popularity with little formal marketing. Its visibility was reportedly enhanced when it was featured as an "App of the Week" on Apple's platform shortly after release.

== Features and technology ==
PeakFinder generates a 360-degree panorama of the surrounding landscape using digital elevation models and identifies visible mountain peaks. The application combines terrain data from multiple sources, including NASADEM, the Shuttle Radar Topography Mission (SRTM), and European LiDAR datasets. These data are supplemented with geographic information from OpenStreetMap, GeoNames, and other regional sources.

The application is known for its minimalist visualization of terrain, which avoids colour shading and instead emphasizes contrast to improve visibility in bright sunlight. PeakFinder also supports augmented reality by overlaying mountain labels and terrain outlines on the smartphone camera view.

In addition to mountain identification, the application displays the Sun's path for the selected date and can optionally show the Moon's path. Because the date can be adjusted manually, the feature can be used to determine the position of sunrise and sunset for specific locations and dates, making it useful for landscape photography and planning outdoor activities.

PeakFinder can be used offline after downloading the required data for a selected region in advance.

== Reception ==
PeakFinder has been featured in numerous hiking, outdoor recreation, and mountaineering publications as a tool for mountain identification. In 2023, the German newspaper Die Zeit described the application as the "Shazam for mountains", referring to its ability to identify peaks in a manner analogous to music-recognition software.

The application's ability to display solar and lunar paths for arbitrary dates has also led to its use in archaeoastronomy. In collaboration with researchers associated with the Archaeological Institute of the University of Basel, additional functions were developed to support archaeoastronomical analyses.
