= Ashwin Navin =

American businessman

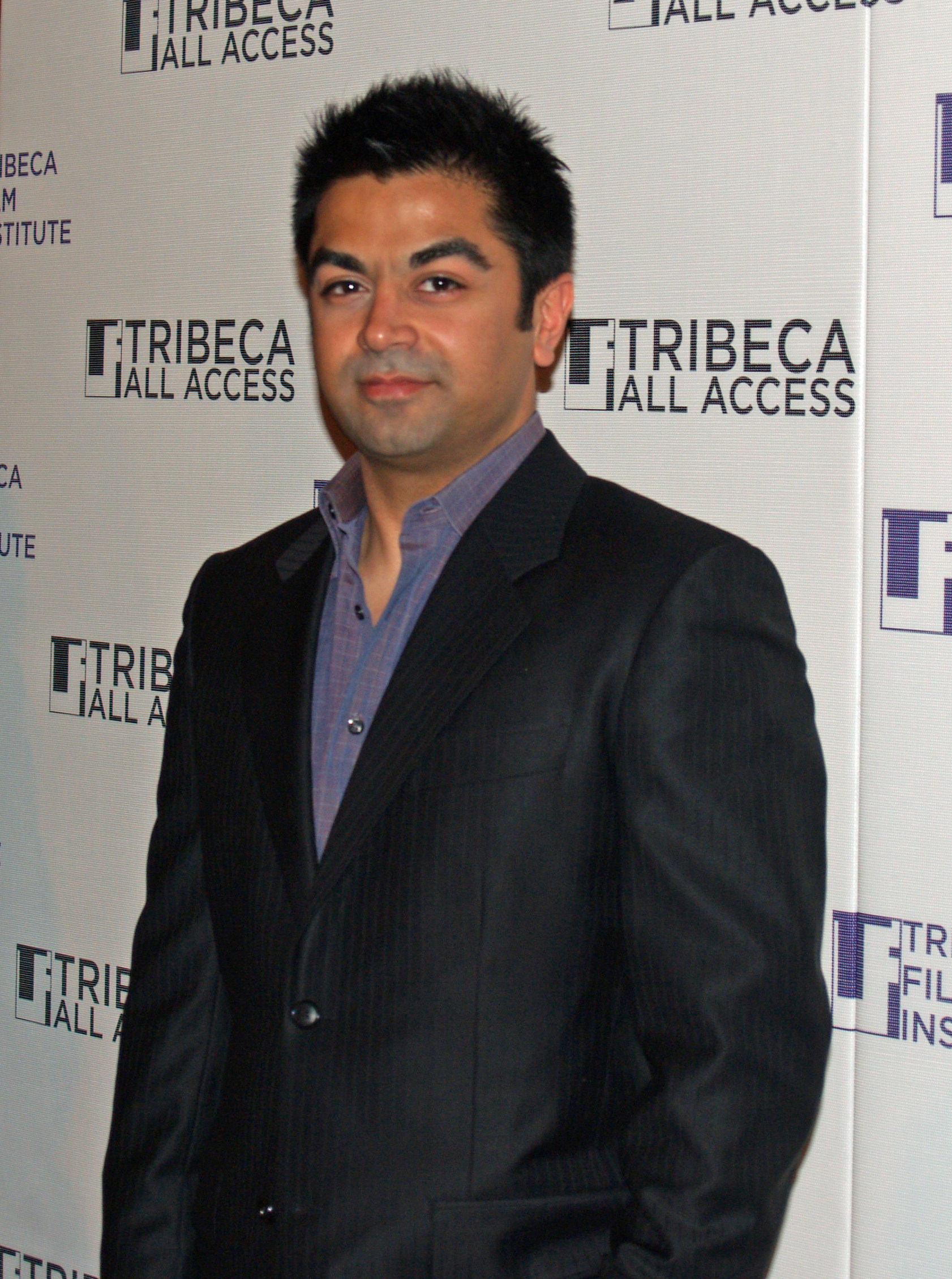
- Born: c. 1977 (age 48–49)
- Occupation: Entrepreneur
- Known for: CEO and Co-founder Samba TV

Ashwin Navin (born c.1977) is an American entrepreneur who is the CEO and co-founder of Samba TV, a data and analytics service that measures television viewership using opt-in data from Internet-connected devices and set-top boxes. The company has been compared to more traditional TV measurement firms like Nielsen which rely on the people meter to gather viewership data.

Prior to Samba TV, Navin was the president and co-founder of BitTorrent, Inc. He joined Bram Cohen, the inventor of BitTorrent, in 2004 and reportedly handled business and company-related matters while Cohen focused on engineering and product development.

Navin reportedly evaluated Cohen's invention for Yahoo! in 2004. Although it was a notable development for the Internet, BitTorrent was widely considered to be the bane of the film industry, because it made the cost of transferring large files, including unlicensed film copies, negligible to the end user.

== Early career ==
Navin is a 1999 graduate of Claremont McKenna College with a dual B.A. in government and economics. Before BitTorrent, he was employed at Yahoo! from 2002 to 2004 in its corporate development group which handled corporate strategy and acquisitions. Before Yahoo!, Navin worked on Wall Street with Goldman Sachs and Merrill Lynch both as an investment banker and research analyst.

In 2000, Navin helped start Epoch Partners, a technology-based financial services company that was acquired by Goldman Sachs in 2001.

== Commercializing BitTorrent ==
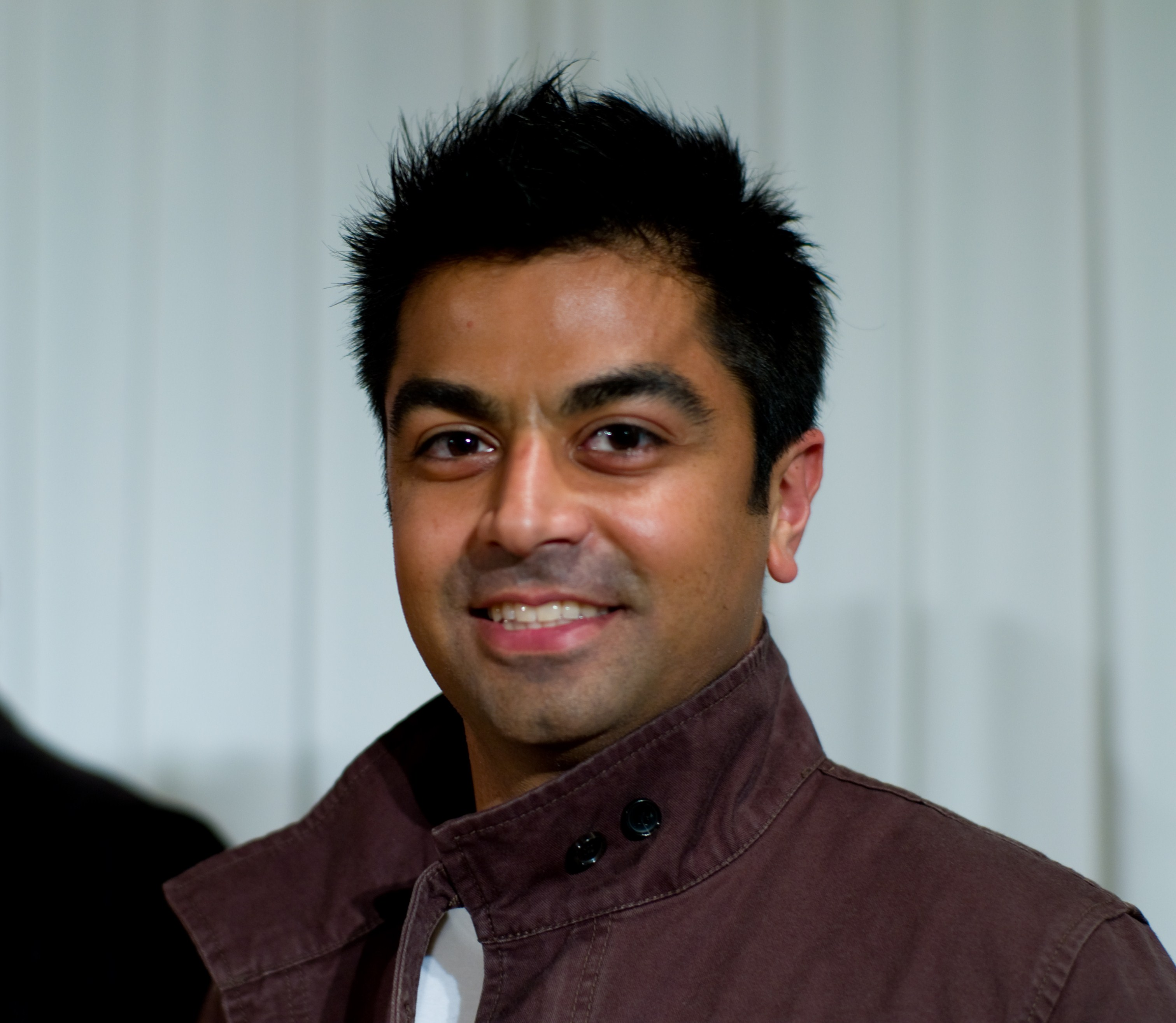
Ashwin Navin in 2007

Cohen entrusted Navin with the responsibility of crafting a business model for BitTorrent with hopes of bringing BitTorrent out of the fringes and into the mainstream. Navin has assumed the public face of the company as an evangelist for its commercial viability. In 2007, Navin launched 3 commercial products: the BitTorrent Entertainment Network in February, the BitTorrent SDK in June, and BitTorrent DNA in October. As the foundation for these products, in 2006 Navin acquired uTorrent which is the largest Torrent client in the world, outside China.

To catalyze BitTorrent's commercialization, Navin began by engaging movie industry executives directly. Although predicted by many to be highly unlikely, BitTorrent has struck relationships with many major media companies including Warner Brothers, 20th Century Fox, Paramount Pictures, MTV, Lionsgate, Kadokawa Pictures, and some others.

Beyond copyright issues, BitTorrent also faced struggles with cable companies and Internet service providers which were overwhelmed with high volumes of P2P traffic on their networks. In the wake of FCC hearings that pitted Comcast and BitTorrent against each other for traffic management policies that inhibited P2P file transfers, Navin was responsible for striking a deal with Comcast that resolved the companies' differences and defused a contested issue in the Network Neutrality debate.

== Founding Samba TV ==
After leaving BitTorrent, Navin founded Samba TV in 2008 (at the time called Flingo) with the vision of developing software for Smart TVs. The initial goal was to help media companies like Showtime, FOX, A+E Networks, TMZ, Revision3, PBS and CBS develop TV apps that synchronize with linear Broadcast programming and Non-linear media.

In 2011, the company launched its patented automatic content recognition technology, which uses video fingerprinting to identify on-screen content and power cross-screen interactive TV apps on Smart TVs.

Mark Cuban, August Capital and Gary Lauder led Samba TV's first round of l funding at CES in 2012. And, in 2013, with the Samba TV name, the company launched the first cross-screen advertising solution tied to real-time contextual awareness of what's on a Smart TV screen within a household.

In 2017, Inc Magazine named Samba TV one of the fastest-growing companies in America. In 2020, Samba TV publicly confirmed that it crossed over $100M in revenue for the 2019 fiscal year and published its path for continued global expansion.

Samba TV filed a registration statement for an initial public offering in November 2021, but requested its withdrawal in May 2022 after deciding not to pursue the offering.
