= Sun path (disambiguation) =

Sun path is the arc-like path that the Sun appears to follow across the sky.

It may also refer to:

- Ecliptic, the annual path of the Sun against the fixed stars
- Analemma, the path of the Sun through a year at the same time of day
- Sun's orbit, the Sun's galactic motion
