= Chris Barton =

Chris Barton may refer to:

- Chris Barton (author), American author of children's books
- Chris Barton (cyclist) (born 1988), American cyclist
- Chris Barton (ice hockey) (born 1987), Canadian ice hockey player
- Christopher Barton (1927–2013), Irish rower who competed in the 1948 Summer Olympics
- Chris Barton (businessman), American technology entrepreneur
