= Samuel Alex =

American radio and TV personality

Sam Alex
- Born: Samuel Alex; Chicago
- Occupations: Radio and TV personality

Samuel Alex, also known as Sam Alex, is an American radio and TV personality. He is the host of the radio program "The Sam Alex Show" which is syndicated by the Sun Broadcast Group. Alex is a Special Correspondent for the American syndicated entertainment television news magazine show Celebrity Page.

== Career ==
For 5 years Alex was host of "Taste of Country Nights" a five-hour nightly radio show distributed by Townsquare Media to more than 100 stations nationwide. On May 8, 2019, Alex began to produce "The Sam Alex Show".

In 2016, Alex appeared as himself on an episode of Nashville on ABC.

== Awards ==
- In 2019, Alex received the Illinois State University “Outstanding Young Alumni Award.”
- In 2016 Alex was nominated for the Academy of Country Music Awards National On-Air Personality of the Year.
- Edison Research and RAIN honored Alex in their Audio's 30 Under 30 list in 2014.
- Alex won the Indiana Broadcasters Association Spectrum Award for Personality of the Year in 2009.

== Charity ==
Alex serves as an ambassador for Get Caught Reading, a national campaign to promote literacy.
