= Philip Inghelbrecht =

CEO of Tatari

Philip Inghelbrecht is an entrepreneur, investor, founder, and CEO of Tatari, an advertising platform that allows brands and agencies to buy and measure TV ads across streaming TV, linear TV, and online video. Before Tatari, Philip was a founding key member and former president of TrueCar and a co-founder of Shazam.

In addition, he previously ran business development at Rockmelt (acquired by Yahoo) and led sports and entertainment partnerships for Google/YouTube. He also serves as the executive chairman of Boomerang.

== Education ==
Inghelbrecht pursued his undergraduate studies in business engineering with a finance concentration at the University of Leuven from 1990 to 1994. As part of an exchange program, he spent six months at Eberhard Karls University of Tübingen in Germany, sponsored by a European Union scholarship. Later, he earned his MBA from the University of California, Berkeley Haas School of Business from 1998 to 2000, during which he was honored with the Fulbright Scholarship and the Amcham Gold Award.

== Career ==
In 1995, Philip Inghelbrecht started his career in investment banking at Bank Dewaay (later HSBC). From March 1996 to May 1998, he worked as a derivatives trader managing the bank's $2 billion EMTN program.

In December 1999, Philip Inghelbrecht co-founded Shazam with Chris Barton and was involved in all aspects of the company's operations. In March 2018, Apple Inc. acquired Shazam, recognizing its technology and potential for integration within Apple's ecosystem.

In 2005, Inghelbrecht joined Google's video division and transferred to YouTube following the acquisition in 2006. At YouTube, he oversaw the sports and entertainment department (Discovery, NBA, etc.) as well as syndication and copyright management.

From October 2008 to January 2010, Philip Inghelbrecht served as president of TrueCar.

In 2018, Philip Inghelbrecht founded and became CEO of Tatari, a convergent TV ad (linear, streaming, and online video) platform for brands and agencies. Tatari was recognized as one of the best places to work and for its industry-leading technology, winning awards for best-connected TV ad platform, most innovative TV ad technology, and 16 hottest ad tech companies.

In August 2021, Inghelbrecht co-founded Boomerang, assuming the role of executive chairman. Boomerang improves the way businesses engage with their customers through new technologies and strategic partnerships.
