= Brian James (basketball) =

American basketball coach (born 1956)

Northwestern Wildcats
- Position: Assistant coach
- League: Big Ten Conference

Personal information
- Born: 1956 (age 69–70) Taylorville, Illinois, U.S.

Career information
- High school: Glenbrook North (Northbrook, Illinois)

Career history

Coaching
- 1995–1998: Detroit Pistons (assistant)
- 1998–2001: Toronto Raptors (assistant)
- 2001–2003: Washington Wizards (assistant)
- 2005–2007: Milwaukee Bucks (assistant)
- 2010–2013: Philadelphia 76ers (assistant)
- 2013–present: Northwestern (assistant)

Brian James (born 1956) is an American basketball coach currently serving as an assistant coach of the Northwestern University. He previously served as an assistant coach for the Philadelphia 76ers (2010–2013) and Milwaukee Bucks (2005–2007).

Prior to joining the Milwaukee Bucks, James served as an assistant coach for the Detroit Pistons (1995–98), Toronto Raptors (1998–01) and Washington Wizards (2001–03). James also served as an advanced scout for the Seattle SuperSonics (2004–2005) as well as an NBA analyst for ESPN.com.

Before his NBA coaching career, James enjoyed heavy success coaching Illinois high school basketball. In 18 seasons, James accumulated a varsity record of 196-79 (.713), won five league championships with Glenbrook North High School, and appeared in the Illinois state tournament four times. James began his coaching career as an assistant coach of the Wilmington High School boys' basketball team in Wilmington, Illinois in the late 1970s, and in the 1980s served as an assistant coach for the Taylorville High School boys basketball team.

On June 13, 2013, James became an assistant coach for Northwestern University.
