= Sun chart =

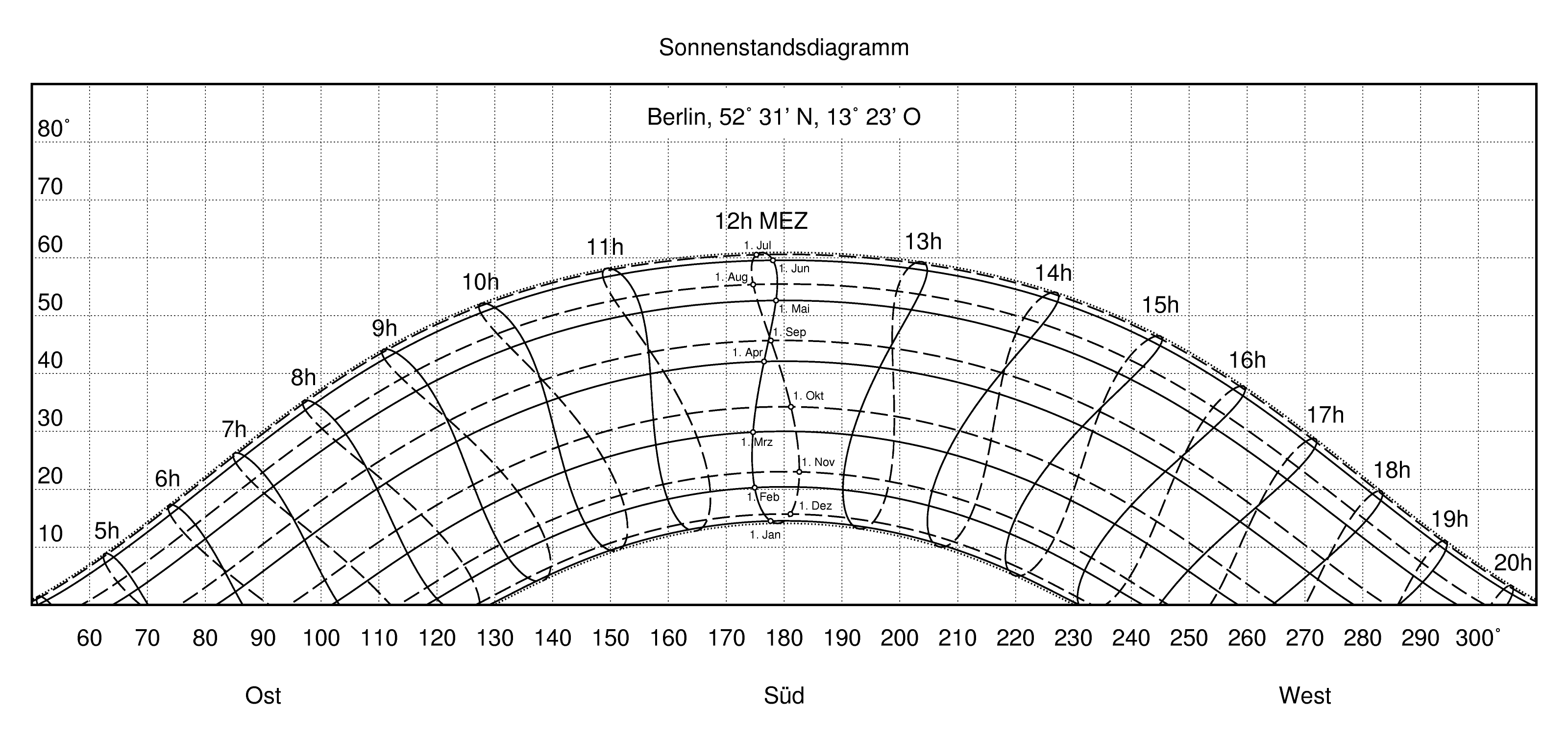
Sun chart for Berlin

A Sun chart is a plot of the ecliptic of the Sun through the sky throughout the year at a particular location (longitude and latitude) on Earth.

== Description ==
Most sun charts plot azimuth versus altitude throughout the days of the winter solstice and summer solstice, as well as a number of intervening days. Since the apparent movement of the Sun as viewed from Earth is nearly symmetrical about the solstice, plotting dates for one half of the year gives a good approximation for the rest of the year. Thus, to simplify the diagram, some sun charts show days for different months as the same, e.g. March 21 equals September 21. The accompanying sun chart for Berlin accounts for deviations in symmetry between the two halves of the year through the use of the analemma, represented by each figure eight on the chart.

The graph may show the entire horizon or only that half of the horizon closest to the equator. Sky view obstructions can be superimposed upon a Sun chart to obtain the insolation of a location.

== See also ==
- Sun path
