= Dave Cruikshank =

American speed skater

Personal information
- Full name: David Wright "Dave" Cruikshank
- Born: January 11, 1969 (age 57) Chicago, Illinois, USA
- Height: 6 ft 0 in (1.83 m)
- Weight: 205 lb (93 kg)

Sport
- Sport: Speed skating

David Wright "Dave" Cruikshank (born January 11, 1969, in Chicago, Illinois) is a four-time U.S. Olympic speedskater, an NHL skating and performance coach, owner of DC Hybrid Skating, a performance training center for hockey players in Milwaukee, WI.

== Personal life ==
Cruikshank attended Glenbrook North High School, where he played varsity baseball and soccer; he graduated magna cum laude from Carroll College with a degree in Business Management. He is the husband of five-time Olympic gold medalist Bonnie Blair, one of the top female speed skaters of her time and one of the most decorated female athletes in Olympic history. Blair and Cruikshank married at the ages of 32 and 27 respectively.

== Speedskating career ==
After attending a speedskating practice, Cruikshank switched from ice hockey to speedskating at the age of eight in Northbrook, Illinois, an area known for its strong tradition of speedskating Olympians. He became a member of the World Short Track Team in 1986.

In 1987, at the age of seventeen, he won the Junior World 500 meters, his first major long track international competition; a year later, he made the 1988 Olympic Team, winning the 1,000 meters at the Olympic Trials.

In 1989, Cruikshank medaled in a World Cup competition and placed 13th overall in his first World Sprint Championships; Cruikshank's career continued, resulting in his making more World Championship Teams and three more Olympic Teams (1992, 1994, and 1998).

US Speedskating inducted Cruikshank into the US Speedskating Hall of Fame in 2008; Cruikshank had competed in international long track events for 16 years.

	Olympic Record	
	Men's Speedskating Competitor for the United States	
Rank	Olympic Games	Event
22	1992 Albertville	500 m
19	1994 Lillehammer	500 m
25	1998 Nagano	500 m

== Skating and performance coach career ==
After retiring from skating, Cruikshank founded, in November 2002, a performance training center for ice hockey players in Milwaukee, WI.
