= Samba TV =

Television analytics company

- Original authors: David Harrison, Omar Zennadi
- Developer: Free Stream Media Corp.
- Release: GPL
- Written in: Python
- Operating system: Windows, Mac OS X and Linux
- Available in: English
- License: GPL
- Website: samba.tv

Samba TV is a television technology company that offers real-time insights and audience analytics. It was founded in 2008 by early employees of BitTorrent, including Samba TV's current chief executive officer, Ashwin Navin. The company develops software for televisions, set-top boxes, smart phones and tablets to enable interactive television through personalization. Through its portfolio of applications and TV platform technologies, Samba TV is built directly into the TV or set-top box and will recognize onscreen content—live or time-shifted—and make relevant information available to users at their request.

The service is available only after a user activates it on a device, and is supported by interest-based advertising delivered on the television or on devices within the household. Through APIs and SDKs for mobile application software developers, Samba TV is usable on a second screen or the TV itself. Samba TV has a global addressable footprint of 46 million devices globally, 28 million of which are in the United States. Its devices are distributed in roughly 118 countries.

The company has raised over $40 million in capital from Disney, Time Warner, August Capital, Interpublic Group, Liberty Global, Stagwell, A+E Networks as well as individuals like Mark Cuban, Kun Gao, founder of Crunchyroll, James Hong, founder of Hot or Not, Charles Huang, founder of Guitar Hero, angel investor Tom McInerney, and others.

== History ==
Samba
- Type: VC funded
- Industry: Media, broadcast, television, digital cinema, Internet, Automatic Content Recognition, Social television, second screen, Smart TV, application software, Interactive TV
- Founded: San Francisco, CA (incorporated 2008)
- Headquarters: San Francisco, California
- Key people: Ashwin Navin, chief executive officer
- Website: Samba.tv

The company was founded as Flingo in 2008, to help media companies like Showtime, Fox, A+E Networks, TMZ, Revision3, PBS and CBS develop apps on Smart TVs that synchronize with linear broadcast programming and non-linear media. In January 2012, Samba TV launched one-click sharing on social networks like Facebook and Twitter from the television. In January 2013, the company announced further developments and features and named its interactive TV platform Samba.

=== Acquisitions ===
In September 2013, the company adopted the Samba TV name.

In October 2017, The Walt Disney Company became a strategic investor in Samba TV to better understand TV viewership and engagement with advertising.

In December 2018, Samba TV acquired Screen6, a firm offering real-time, cross-device identity resolutions.

In August 2019, Samba TV acquired Wove, to help direct-to-consumer brands TV ad targeting.

In August 2019, Samba TV acquired, Axwave, an international software development company.

In January 2023, Samba TV divested its media business to programmatic platform, MiQ.

In October 2024, Samba TV acquired Semasio, the global leader of contextual web intelligence, for undisclosed terms.

In June 2026, Samba TV announced that it had acquired Bestever AI, a GenAI platform built for generating ad creatives at scale.

=== Partnerships ===
In 2016, Samba TV partnered with MediaMath.

In 2017, Samba TV partnered with video ad serving platform SpotX and media/advertising research company Kantar.

In 2019, Samba TV partnered with Twitter to help measure the social network's effectiveness in driving tune-in. That same year, Samba TV also partnered with video streaming aggregator Reelgood.

In 2020, Samba TV partnered with global programmatic media partner MiQ, global technology company The Trade Desk, media measurement and analytics company Comscore, as well as Amazon Web Services. and TiVo. That same year, Samba TV also partnered with point-of-sale data provider Catalina and paper product manufacturer Georgia-Pacific to measure cross-channel media spend.

In 2021, Samba TV partnered with online advertising software company Pubmatic, as well as television measurement and analytics company 605.

In 2024, Samba TV partnered with Snap Inc. to help brands further understand the value of advertising on Snapchat. Also in 2024, Samba TV partnered with NOVA Entertainment; IRIS.TV; QMS; Madhive selected Samba TV as its ACR partner; FreeWheel selected Samba TV as its preferred ACR partner; expanded its partnership with Havas; partnered with StackAdapt; made deal with Meta; and Captify integrated Samba TV technology.

In 2025, Samba TV partnered with Attain to expand incremental measurement and OzTam on a POC (a first initiative for Australia).

=== Products ===
In July 2021, Samba TV launched its global Real-time TV Viewership Dashboard, an interactive TV analytics dashboard featuring geographic and demographic analysis of viewership in real-time across the world, starting with four of the largest media markets: the U.S., U.K., Germany, and Australia.

Also in 2021, Samba TV announced its proprietary identifier, SambaID, as part of its Samba TV Identity solution, giving marketers, publishers, and platforms the ability to transact with each other using a variety of different currencies against which to optimize. Programmatic research technology firm Lucid later announced its use of SambaID for clients like Digitas and Wavemaker.

In 2024, Samba TV unveiled its political audiences platform geared toward political advertisers in the 2024 Presidential Election and surrounding candidate and legislative races.

=== Customers ===
Samba TV's technology is integrated into 24 Smart TV brands globally. These brands are listed on their website as Philips, Sony, Toshiba, beko, Magnavox, TCL, Grundig, Sanyo, AOC, Seiki, Element, Sharp, Westinghouse, Vestel, Panasonic, Hitachi, Finlux, Telefunken, Digihome, JVC, Luxor, Techwood, and Regal.

== Features ==
Samba TV tracks what appears on the users' TV by reading pixels and utilizing this data for personalized recommendations on the TV or mobile apps connected to the television. This capability extends to streaming programs and video games played on the television.

In January 2021, Samba TV introduced Picture Perfect – an artificial intelligence (AI) technology that optimizes picture quality in real time for gaming, live sports, and movies. Designed to be embedded within the TV, Picture Perfect will recognize and optimize the quality of the content playing on the screen in real time, with or without an internet connection.

== Awards ==
In 2021, Samba TV was chosen by Adweek readers as "Best in Measurement Solutions" during the 2021 Adweek Readers' Choice: Best of Tech Partner Awards.

== Ownership ==
Samba TV was incorporated as Free Stream Media Corp. in 2008, a company founded by Ashwin Navin, David Harrison, Alvir Navin, Omar Zennadi and Todd Johnson. According to the public source code repository, Flingo's open source client was written by David Harrison and Omar Zennadi in Python, and is free software licensed under the GPL.

In February 2012, Flingo announced a $7 million Series A round investment from August Capital. In May 2012, Flingo added additional investors, closing at $8 million, including entrepreneur Mark Cuban and Gary Lauder. Cuban discovered Flingo at CES 2012 when he saw a crowd in the Flingo booth watching a demonstration of its SyncApps technology. The funding helped Flingo expand its presence with smart TV and device manufacturers, building on its existing partnerships.

In April 2015, Interpublic Group announced a strategic investment in Samba TV. Subsequently, Samba TV announced more strategic investors totaling $30 million in a Series B round coming from Liberty Global, Disney, WarnerMedia, Interpublic Group, MDC Partners, A+E Networks and Union Grove Venture Partners.

== See also ==
- Smart TV
- Interactive television
- Social television
- Enhanced TV
- Digital Video Fingerprinting
- Second screen
- Automatic content recognition
