= Tatari (platform) =

Television advertising platform

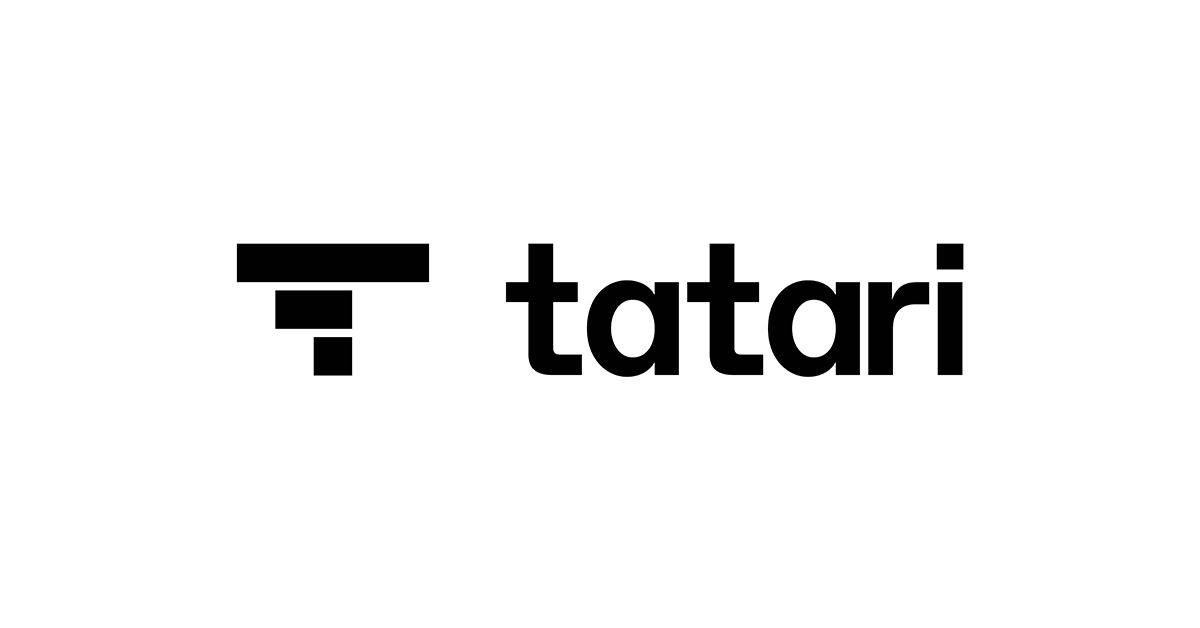
- Company type: Private
- Industry: Data and analytics
- Founded: 2016
- Founder: Mike Swinson and Philip Inghelbrecht
- Headquarters: San Francisco, California, United States
- Website: tatari.tv

Tatari is a convergent TV ad platform that allows the creation, management, and measurement of advertisements across linear TV, streaming TV, and online video platforms.

In March 2022, Tatari acquired TheViewPoint, a CTV SSP monetization platform. In April 2022, Tatari launched Similar Inventory, which provides suggestions for linear and streaming TV inventory based on existing campaigns. A year later, in June 2023, Tatari launched Vault, a sister company that creates "tokens" by matching first-party data from publishers and advertisers with Experian identifiers. Tatari, TheViewPoint, and Vault are three separate subsidiary companies under a parent company called Infra.

== History ==
=== 2016–2019 ===
Tatari was established in 2016 by Mike Swinson and Philip Inghelbrecht.

=== 2020–2022 ===
In 2020, Tatari launched an automated next day metric tool, which promises to provide advertisers with next-day return on ad spend (ROAS) insights for linear TV campaigns. This tool utilizes data from more than 21 million households to offer advertisers detailed performance metrics and audience behavior analysis shortly after a campaign airs. In 2020, AdAge named Tatari best place to work. In the following year 2021, Tatari formed a partnership with Clearco, a TV advertising analytics firm. Clearco, a funding provider, assisted new brands with access to up to $10 million in funding for TV advertising.

In March 2022, Tatari acquired TheViewPoint to enhance its connected TV (CTV) advertising capabilities. In April 2022, it launched Similar Inventory to help advertisers scale their TV advertising campaigns more efficiently. In October 2022, Tatari licensed its media buying software to advertising agencies, to expand its reach and impact in the TV advertising space.

In October 2022, Tatari announced that over 200 direct brands have adopted their platform for purchasing and analyzing TV advertising. Tatari also partnered with Samba TV to integrate Samba TV's extensive viewership data. In October 2022, Shopify announced Tatari as the exclusive TV App Partner in Shopify's Plus Certified App Program. In 2022, according to Inc Magazine, Tatari was named a Best Workplace in the Advertising & Marketing category.

=== 2023-present ===
In October 2023, the company was named the Most Innovative TV Advertising Technology according to the 2023 AdExchanger awards. In December 2023, Tatari was recognized as a "Hottest Ad Tech Company" by Business Insider. In 2023, Tatari was also named Programmatic Power Player by AdExchanger. In March 2024, Tatari improved its TV ad measurement tools by adding multi-touch attribution models and real-time analytics. In July 2024, Tatari released its AI-driven Planning Engine, a fully AI-powered campaign management platform.
