= Sun Broadcast Group =

Broadcast network in Boca Raton, Florida

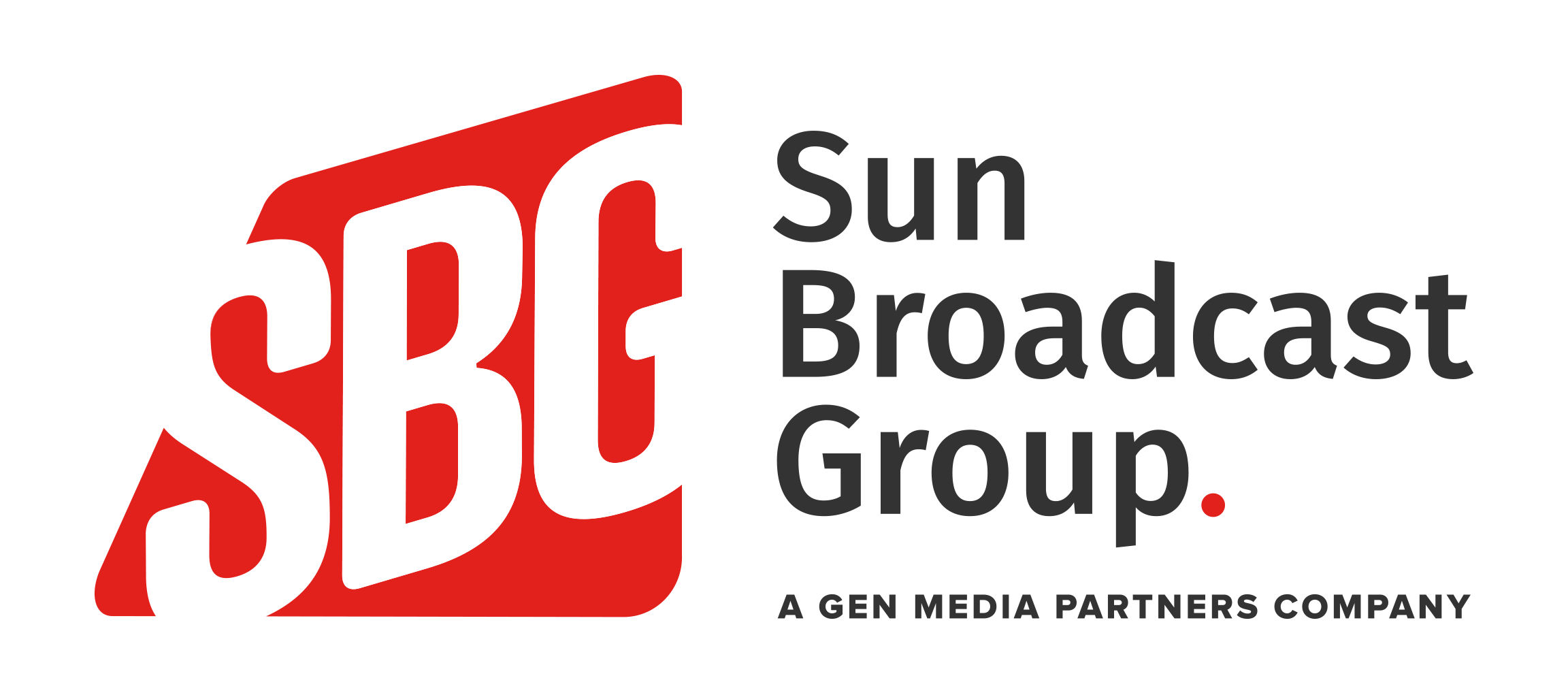
- Company type: Private
- Industry: Radio broadcasting
- Founded: 2008
- Headquarters: Boca Raton; New York City; Cleveland
- Key people: Jason Bailey (CEO)
- Website: Official Website

The Sun Broadcast Group is an American radio network headquartered in Boca Raton, Florida and New York City. The network covers over 5,500 affiliates and serves around 140 million monthly listeners in both English and Spanish as of 2014. In 2014 and 2015, it was listed on the Inc. 5000 list as one of the fastest-growing companies in America and the single fastest growing company in the broadcast radio industry. Programs broadcast on the network include The Marilu Henner Show, The House of Hair with Dee Snider, The Hit List with Fitz, the NCAA College Football Game of the Week, and Yahoo! Deportes, among others. Sun is also a founding member of the Shazam for Radio interactive radio platform.

== History ==
=== 2008–2012: Early years as Sun Radio Network ===
The Sun Broadcast Group was founded as the Sun Radio Network in Boca Raton, Florida in November 2008 by CEO Jason Bailey. It was designed as a nationwide programmer and syndicator of its own content while also providing programming support and sales representation to other radio networks and syndicators in the United States. In its early days, the network primarily sought small, local advertisers to fund its operation on a comparatively small network. Content produced by Sun included short product placement ads designed to fit within programs on their network. Over time, the company attracted national businesses who would use the network for advertising. By 2011, Sun's network had expanded to 3,000 radio stations covering 99% of the US population. It also officially changed its name to the Sun Broadcast Group in 2011.

=== 2013–2015: Rapid expansion and Shazam for Radio ===
In 2013, the Sun Broadcast Group added The Marilu Henner Show to its syndication lineup. The show launched on September 9, 2013, and was said to be a non-political and non-confrontational alternative to typical talk radio offerings. Also in 2013, Sun began a national sales representation agreement for Ricardo Sanchez's El Mandril Morning Show, the number one Spanish language morning radio program in Los Angeles. In 2014, the company expanded its Sun Latino network—a Spanish-only, nationwide radio network—adding Yahoo! Deportes and ad and affiliate support from Envision Networks. By the end of 2014, the Sun Latino network had around 35 million monthly listeners.

In October 2014, Sun announced a partnership with music detection service, Shazam, to create an interactive radio platform called Shazam for Radio. The platform would effectively allow listeners to use the Shazam app to find information about the current radio personality, social media campaigns and promotions, and music details all during the live broadcast. Shazam for Radio would later expand by adding The Weather Channel (allowing listeners to get hyper-local, "Shazamable" weather reports from the radio to their phones) and Hubbard Radio in 2015. By the end of 2014, Sun had around 142 million monthly listeners on 5,500 general affiliate stations across the United States. The company's revenue also jumped by 520% earning them a spot on the Inc. 5000 list as one of America's fastest growing companies.

=== 2015–2020: Continued growth and beyond ===
In early 2015, Sun teamed with VH1 to create the VH1 Radio Network. Sun primarily handles advertising and affiliate sales for the VH1-run network. Later that year, Sun added The Hit List with Fitz to its Shazam for Radio platform, which was the first interactive country music countdown and allowed listeners to discover content and interact with the show in real time.

In August 2015, Sun again made the Inc. 5000 list as one of America's fastest growing companies with revenue increasing by 629%. Additionally, Sun was named the fastest growing business in the broadcast radio industry and the 11th fastest growing company in all of media in 2015. Sun Latino was also named the largest independent Spanish-language radio network in the United States. In December 2015, Sun CEO, Jason Bailey, was named an Honorary Trustee by the Alliance for Women in Media.

In January 2016, Sun acquired the syndication rights to The House of Hair with Dee Snider. Sun also partnered with Radio Express in February 2016 in an ad sales and affiliate agreement that brought 10 new programs (including La Piedra, La Mex-Cha, and Jacapps) to the network.

In August 2018 Sun Broadcast Group was sold to Gen Media Partners. The business continued as Sun Broadcast Group with Jason Bailey still serving as President overseeing the company.

=== 2020–present: Birth of G Networks ===
In September of 2020 several original Sun staff departed the company including Bailey and longtime COO Julio Aponte.

In February 2020, Sun Broadcast Group announced that it acquired Cleveland based Envision Networks.

Envision's Danno Wolkoff and Laura Orcan Wolkoff were named Chief Operating Officer and VP/Operations, respectively, at Sun, but were both terminated June 23, 2021, for "gross negligence and gross incompetence … in the performance of their duties."

On August 16, 2021, Sun Broadcast Group's parent company, Gen Media Partners, rebranded Sun Broadcast Group as G Networks.

In July 2021, the Wolkoff's sued G Networks alleging the firm owes them $2.1 million.

== Programming and services ==
=== Sun Broadcast Group ===
- The Weather Channel
- Little Steven's Underground Garage
- The Fitz Show
- Slacker & Steve
- The Country Club with Dee Jay Silver
- Download HD

=== Sun Latino ===
- Yahoo! Deportes
