= Axwave =

Axwave, Inc.
- Type: Private
- Industry: Information Technology and Services
- Founded: 2012; 14 years ago
- Founder: Damian Scavo, Loris D'Acunto
- Defunct: 2019
- Fate: Acquired by Samba TV
- Headquarters: Menlo Park, California, United States
- Number of locations: Silicon Valley, New York City, Italy, Poland
- Owner: Samba TV
- Number of employees: 20+
- Website: www.axwave.com

Axwave, Inc. was an international software development company that developed a proprietary fingerprinting-based automatic content recognition (ACR) technology. Axwave was founded by Damián Scavo, a former algorithmic trader and Loris D'Acunto, a nuclear physicist. Axwave was headquartered in Menlo Park CA, and had offices in New York, Italy and Poland. Axwave was acquired by Samba TV in August 2019.

== Corporate history ==
The company was incorporated in April 2012. Its first headquarters was located in Palo Alto, California. Axwave focused on developing a cutting edge fingerprinting-based ACR technology for panel-based research using a mobile people meter. Meters using Axwave ACR were matched to Axwave's media monitoring servers located in North America and Europe. Axwave claimed to improve on the accuracy and speed of the main competitors in the ACR field.

Gsound, a consumer app, was made available to the public in the App Store and Google Play Store as a proof of concept to validate the technology. Gsound reached 1,000,000 downloads while available in the stores.

Axwave's technology is currently used by companies in the media research industry through paid panelists to track key behaviors and viewing habits. Axwave's panelist device technologies are claimed to be about 100 times cheaper and more efficient than the technology previously used in households. Additionally, it allows for recognition of data that has not been watermarked.

Axwave ACR technology in the client device encrypts, compresses and sends small bytes of data to servers, which then matches against a worldwide media catalog. The algorithms used are unique in the field in that they can measure radio, podcasts, TV shows and OTT viewership, and are currently handling billions of queries per month. For example, data collected by Axwave shows that indeed OTT is the 29% of the current market share to date (2015).

A key aspect of the company's success is the content catalogue: it currently covers more than 75,000 TV ads, live TV on the top 140 US channels, up to 35 days of time-shifted TV and the largest OTT content selection in the market (100,000 assets), including all Netflix and Hulu originals, making it the largest catalogue in the industry. Axwave also has TV channels available in 15+ countries and Radio stations worldwide.

Axwave has also developed a TV ads occurrence monitoring solution that covers all the commercials broadcast in the top 100 US TV channels.

The company currently has 3 published patents and 8 provisional patents.

In April 2018, Axwave announced a collaboration with FanDuel and the NBA in the development of NBA InPlay, a real-time mobile fantasy game that uses cutting-edge technology to synchronize with the live broadcasts of any NBA games on cable or satellite.

It was announced in August 2019 that Axwave was acquired by Samba TV.

== Awards ==
- Winner, San Francisco Music Tech in 2014
- Winner, Siemer Wavemaker Award in 2014
- Top 5 Most Innovative Companies SWSX 2014
