= Chris Barton (businessman) =

Founder and first CEO of Shazam

- Born: United States
- Education: University of California, Berkeley (BA, MBA); University of Cambridge (M.Phil)
- Occupations: Entrepreneur, inventor, keynote speaker
- Known for: Co-founding Shazam
- Website: chrisjbarton.com

Chris Barton is an American tech entrepreneur, inventor, investor, and keynote speaker. He founded Shazam, a music identification company, and was its first CEO.

== Early life and education ==
Chris Barton was born and raised in the United States, and lives in California. His father, John P. Barton, was a professor in nuclear physics, and his mother, Claudia F. Barton, was a professor in the field of computer science. His father is British and his mother is French, which he cites as giving him both the interest in living in the UK and the passport to do so; his parents also set up a nuclear physics consultancy, which he credits as inspiration for his choice of an entrepreneurial career. According to Barton himself, he suffered from dyslexia as a child.

Barton graduated from University of California, Berkeley, with a Bachelor of Arts (BA) degree in Economics, and later pursued a Master of Business Administration (MBA) degree from the same institution. Barton also earned a Master in Finance degree from the University of Cambridge.

== Career ==
Barton's career began as a strategy consultant at L.E.K. Consulting in London and the San Francisco Consulting Group, and it also included an internship at Microsoft in London.

=== Shazam ===
In summer 1999, while on an internship in his MBA program, Barton conceived of the idea for Shazam as a service to enable consumers to find out what songs were playing where music could be heard, based on recording the song's audio and pattern-matching it to a database of songs. After conceiving the idea for Shazam, Barton co-founded the company in 2000, along with co-founders Philip Inghelbrecht and Dhiraj Mukherjee, and later, Avery Wang as the fourth co-founder. Barton located the company in London, based on the UK being the world-leading country (at the time) as measured by per-capita music purchases.

During his early tenure with Shazam, as CEO, Barton raised angel funding for the company, buoyed by a summer 2000 technology breakthrough from technical co-founder Avery Wang which enabled him to demonstrate the music recognition technology at fundraising pitches. As CEO, Barton raised $7.5 million in venture capital and secured initial distribution partnerships with the four leading mobile operators in the UK, enabling Shazam to commercially launch in 2002. Barton left to join Google in early 2004 when Google was still a private company, but continued to participate in Shazam's governance as Board Director.

In 2012, Shazam announced that it drove over $300 million a year in music downloads. Shazam had raised $143.5 million in venture capital financing and its investors included Kleiner Perkins, IDG Ventures, DN Capital, Institutional Venture Partners, Sony Music, Universal Music and Warner Music. He remained a Shazam Board Director until 2018, when Shazam was acquired by Apple on September 24, 2018 for a reported $400 million. In 2022, Apple announced that Shazam has been downloaded over 2 billion times.

=== Google and Dropbox ===
From 2004 until 2016, Barton held roles at Google and Dropbox, focusing on areas such as Android business development and establishing partnerships with mobile operators. Barton was the first business development employee at Google to focus on mobile partnerships. He was responsible for leading Google's partnerships with Verizon and AT&T, among others.

He joined Dropbox in late 2011, leading their partnerships with mobile operators. Barton holds 12 patents, including two for Google and five for Dropbox. One of these patents is employed within the Google Search algorithm.

At the United States v. Google LLC anti-monopoly trial held in Washington D.C. in 2023, he was a witness for the Justice Department on their first day of questioning. He was questioned about the deals he helped negotiate with phone companies, and he testified that he made it a priority for Google to be the default search engine on mobile devices.

=== Guard ===
In 2018, he founded Guard Inc., a startup that employs artificial intelligence technology to prevent drowning incidents in swimming pools. Since then, Barton has served as the CEO of the company.

He was keynote speaker at the Scale Computing Platform Summit in Las Vegas in 2025. He was also keynote speaker at Tech Show London in March 2025.

== Personal life ==
Barton had undiagnosed dyslexia-related challenges during his childhood.

Barton appeared in a Super Bowl television advertisement in 2012 for Best Buy, alongside Ray Kurzweil and Kevin Systrom, the founder of Instagram.
