= Sun path =

Arc-like path that the Sun appears to follow across the sky

Seasonal differences in the Sun's declination, as viewed from the mid-northern city of New York, New York

Sun path on a polar graph for any location at the latitude of Rotterdam (51.92ºN). The polar axis marks the solar elevation angle in degree, and the direction marks the solar azimuth angle in degree following the North-clockwise convention. Note that the positive direction of the polar axis is toward the pole of the coordinate system. The labeled hours are in local solar time. Also note that the Sun paths on dates Jul 21, Aug 20, Sep 20, Oct 20, Nov 21, if shown, would practically overlap with that of May 21, Apr 20, Mar 20, Feb 20, Jan 21, respectively.

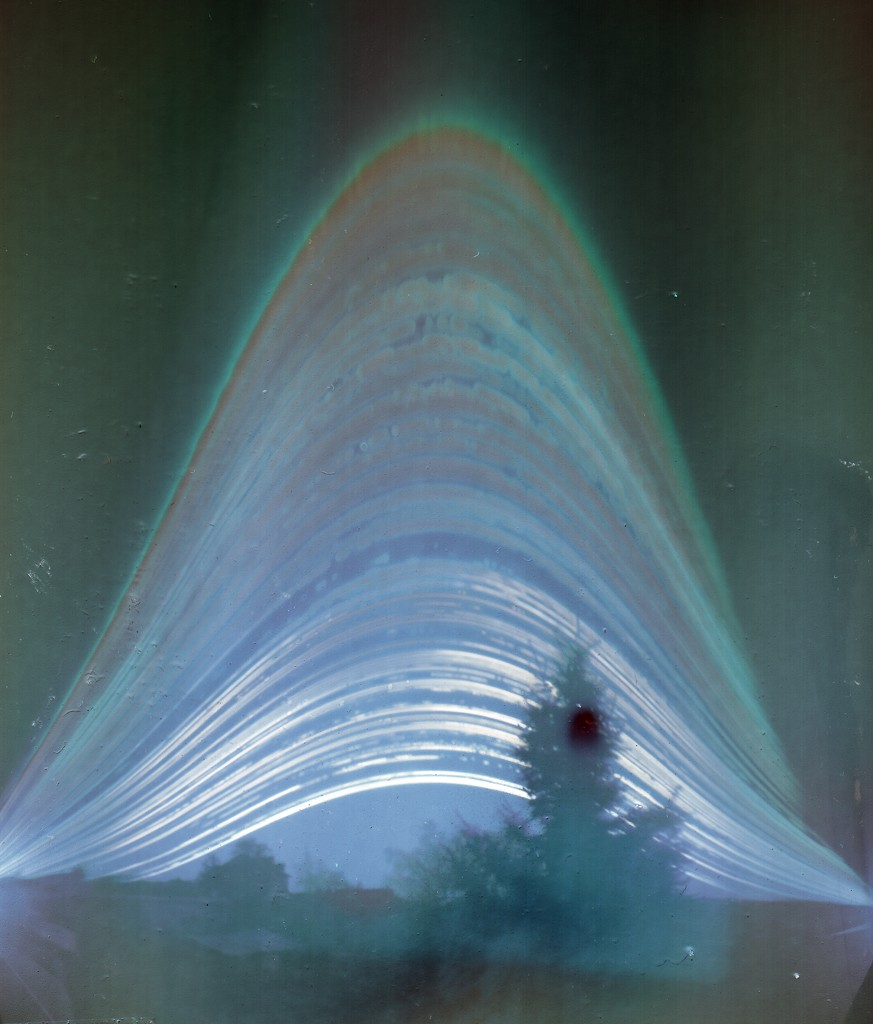
This solargraph exposed over the course of a year shows the Sun's paths of diurnal motion, as seen from Budapest in 2014.

Sun path, sometimes also called day arc, refers to the daily (sunrise to sunset) and seasonal arc-like path that the Sun appears to follow across the sky as the Earth rotates and orbits the Sun. The Sun's path affects the length of daytime experienced and amount of daylight received along a certain latitude during a given season.

The relative position of the Sun is a major factor in the heat gain of buildings and in the performance of solar energy systems. Accurate location-specific knowledge of sun path and climatic conditions is essential for economic decisions about solar collector area, orientation, landscaping, summer shading, and the cost-effective use of solar trackers.

== Angles ==
The solar zenith angle is the zenith angle of the Sun, i.e., the angle between the sun’s rays and the vertical direction. It is the complement to the solar altitude or solar elevation, which is the altitude angle or elevation angle between the Sun’s rays and a horizontal plane. Near (but usually not exactly at) solar noon, the zenith angle is at a minimum and is equal to the absolute value of latitude minus solar declination angle. This is the basis by which ancient mariners navigated the oceans. Solar zenith angle is normally used in combination with the solar azimuth angle to determine the position of the Sun as observed from a given location on the surface of the Earth.

== Effect of the Earth's axial tilt ==
Sun paths at any latitude and any time of the year can be determined from basic geometry. The Earth's axis of rotation tilts about 23.5 degrees, relative to the plane of Earth's orbit around the Sun. As the Earth orbits the Sun, this creates the 47° declination difference between the solstice sun paths, as well as the hemisphere-specific difference between summer and winter.

In the Northern Hemisphere, the winter sun (November, December, January) rises in the southeast, transits the celestial meridian at a low angle in the south (more than 43° above the southern horizon in the tropics), and then sets in the southwest. It is on the south (equator) side of the house all day long. A vertical window facing south (equator side) is effective for capturing solar thermal energy. For comparison, the winter sun in the Southern Hemisphere (May, June, July) rises in the northeast, peaks out at a low angle in the north (more than halfway up from the horizon in the tropics), and then sets in the northwest. There, the north-facing window would let in plenty of solar thermal energy to the house.

In the Northern Hemisphere in summer (May, June, July), the Sun rises in the northeast, peaks out slightly south of overhead point (lower in the south at higher latitude), and then sets in the northwest, whereas in the Southern Hemisphere in summer (November, December, January), the Sun rises in the southeast, peaks out slightly north of overhead point (lower in the north at higher latitude), and then sets in the southwest. A simple latitude-dependent equator-side overhang can easily be designed to block 100% of the direct solar gain from entering vertical equator-facing windows on the hottest days of the year. Roll-down exterior shade screens, interior translucent-or-opaque window quilts, drapes, shutters, movable trellises, etc. can be used for hourly, daily or seasonal sun and heat transfer control (without any active electrical air conditioning).

Everywhere around the world during the equinoxes (March 20/21 and September 22/23) except for the poles, the Sun rises due east and sets due west. In the Northern Hemisphere, the equinox sun peaks in the southern half (about halfway up from the horizon at mid latitude) of the sky, while in the Southern Hemisphere, that Sun peaks in the northern half of the sky. When facing the equator, the Sun appears to move from left to right in the Northern Hemisphere and from right to left in the Southern Hemisphere.

The latitude (and hemisphere)-specific solar path differences are critical to effective passive solar building design. They are essential data for optimal window and overhang seasonal design. Solar designers must know the precise solar path angles for each location they design for, and how they compare to place-based seasonal heating and cooling requirements.

In the U.S., the precise location-specific altitude-and-azimuth seasonal solar path numbers are available from NOAA – the "equator side" of a building is south in the Northern Hemisphere, and north in the Southern Hemisphere, where the peak summer solstice solar altitude occurs on December 21.

=== Shadow of a vertical stick at solar noon ===
On the Equator, the noontime Sun will be straight overhead, and thus a vertical stick will cast no shadow, on the equinoxes. On the Tropic of Cancer (about 23.4°N), a vertical stick will cast no shadow on the June solstice (Northern Hemisphere summer), and the rest of the year its noon shadow will point to the North Pole. On the Tropic of Capricorn (about 23.4°S), a vertical stick will cast no shadow on the December solstice (Southern Hemisphere summer), and the rest of the year its noon shadow will point to the South Pole. North of the Tropic of Cancer, the noon shadow will always point north, and south of the Tropic of Capricorn, the noon shadow will always point south.

=== Duration of daylight ===
Within the polar circles (north of the Arctic Circle and south of the Antarctic Circle), each year will experience at least one day when the Sun remains below the horizon for 24 hours (on the winter solstice), and at least one day when the Sun remains above the horizon for 24 hours (on the summer solstice).

In the middle latitudes, the length of daytime, as well as solar altitude and azimuth, vary from one day to the next, and from season to season. The difference between the lengths of a long summer day and of a short winter day increases as one moves farther away from the Equator.

== Visualizations ==
=== Visualization 1 ===
The pictures below show the following perspectives from Earth, marking the hourly positions of the Sun on both solstice days. When connected, the suns form two day arcs, the paths along which the Sun appears to follow on the celestial sphere in its diurnal motion. The longer arc is always the midsummer path while the shorter arc the midwinter path. The two arcs are 46.88° (2 × 23.44°) apart, indicating the declination difference between the solstice suns.

In addition, some "ghost" suns are visible below the horizon, as much as 18° down, during which twilight occurs. The pictures can be used for both the northern and the southern hemispheres of Earth. A theoretical observer is supposed to stand near the tree on a small island in the middle of the sea. The green arrows represent the cardinal directions.

- In the Northern Hemisphere, north is to the left. The Sun rises in the east (far arrow), culminates in the south (to the right) while moving to the right, and sets in the west (near arrow). Both rise and set positions are displaced towards the north in midsummer and the south in midwinter.
- In the Southern Hemisphere, south is to the left. The Sun rises in the east (near arrow), culminates in the north (to the right) while moving to the left, and sets in the west (far arrow). Both rise and set positions are displaced towards the south in midsummer and the north in midwinter.

The following cases are depicted:

- On the abstract line of the Equator (0° latitude), the Sun's maximum altitude is great during the entire year, but it does not form a perfect right angle with the ground at noon every day. In fact it happens two days of the year, during the equinoxes. The solstices are the dates that the Sun stays farthest away from the zenith but also in those cases it's high in the sky, reaching an altitude of 66.56° either to the north or the south. All days of the year, solstices included, have the same length of 12 hours.
- Solstice day arcs as viewed from 20° latitude. The Sun culminates at 46.56° altitude in winter and 93.44° altitude in summer. In this case an angle larger than 90° means that the culmination takes place at an altitude of 86.56° in the opposite cardinal direction. For example, in the southern hemisphere, the Sun remains in the north during winter, but can reach over the zenith to the south in midsummer. Summer days are longer than winter days, but the difference is no more than approximately two and a half hours. The daily path of the Sun is steep at the horizon the whole year round, resulting in a twilight of only about one hour and 20 minutes in the morning and in the evening.
- Solstice day arcs as viewed from 50° latitude. During the winter solstice, Sun does not rise more than 16.56° above the horizon at midday, but 63.44° in summer solstice above the same horizon direction. The difference in the length of the day between summer and winter, from here to the north, begin to be striking – slightly more than 8 hours at winter solstice, to more than 16 hours during the summer solstice. Likewise is the difference in direction of sunrise and sunset. At this latitude at midnight (around 1 a.m. with summer legal hour) the summer sun is 16.56° below the horizon, which means that astronomical twilight continues the whole night. This phenomenon is known as the grey nights, nights when it does not get dark enough for astronomers to do their observations of the deep sky. Above 60° latitude, the Sun would be even closer to the horizon, only 6.56° away from it. Then civil twilight continues almost all night, only a little bit of nautical twilight around the local midnight. Above 66.56° latitude, there is no sunset at all, a phenomenon referred to as the midnight sun.
- Solstice day arcs as viewed from 70° latitude. At local noon the winter Sun culminates at −3.44°, and the summer Sun at 43.44°. Said another way, during the winter the Sun does not rise above the horizon, it is the polar night. There will be still a strong twilight though. At local midnight the summer Sun culminates at 3.44°. Said another way, it does not set; it is the polar day.
- Solstice day arcs as viewed from either pole (90° latitude). At the time of the summer or winter solstices, the Sun is 23.44° degrees above or below the horizon, respectively, irrespective of time of day. Whilst the Sun is up (during summer months) it will circle around the whole sky (clockwise from the North Pole and counter-clockwise from the South Pole), appearing to stay at the same angle from the horizon, therefore the concept of day or night is meaningless. The angle of elevation will gradually change on an annual cycle, with the Sun reaching its highest point at the summer solstice, and rising or setting at the equinox, with extended periods of twilight lasting several days after the autumn equinox and before the spring equinox.

Solstice day arcs as viewed from selected latitudes

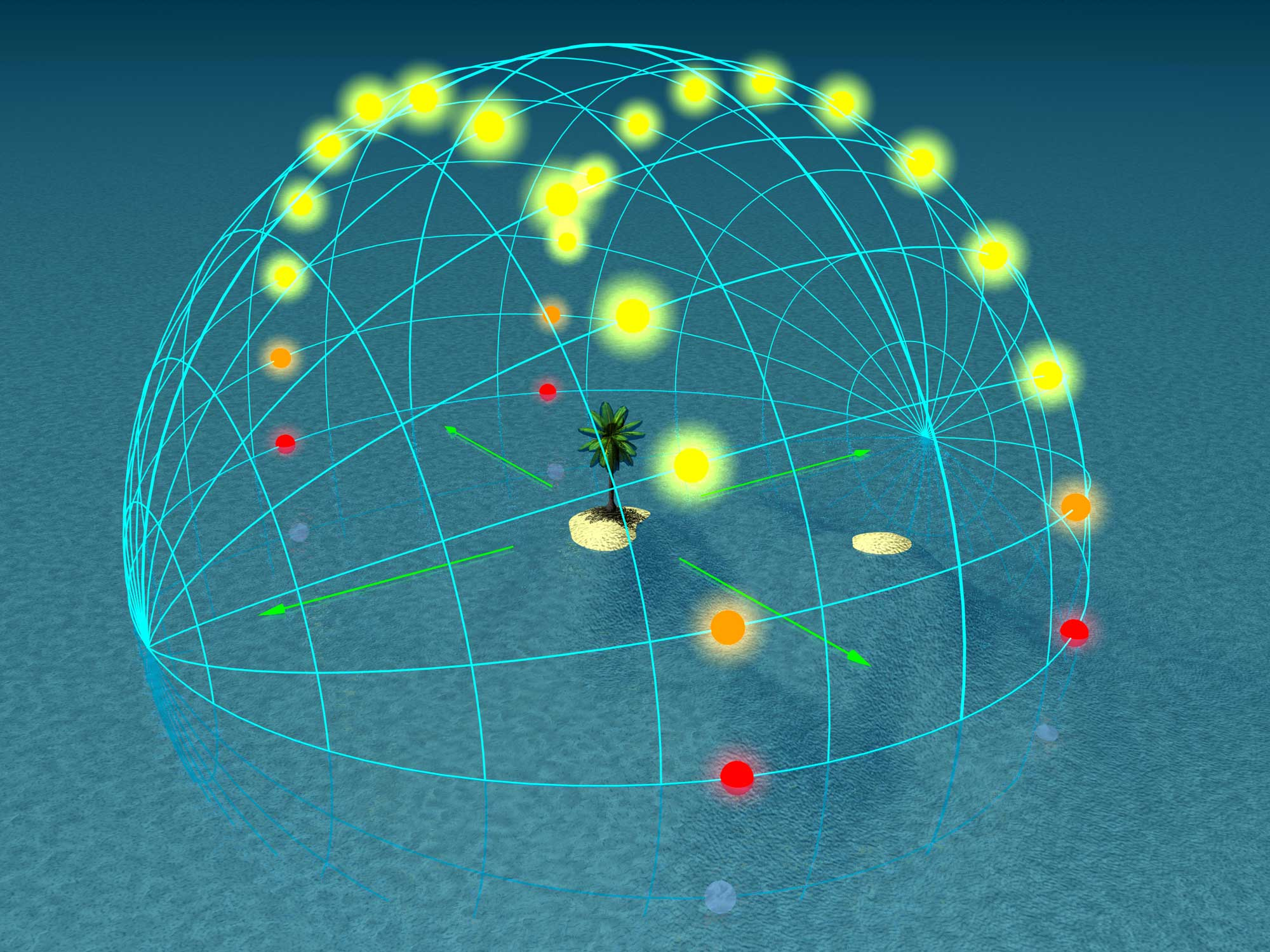
0° latitude (the Equator)

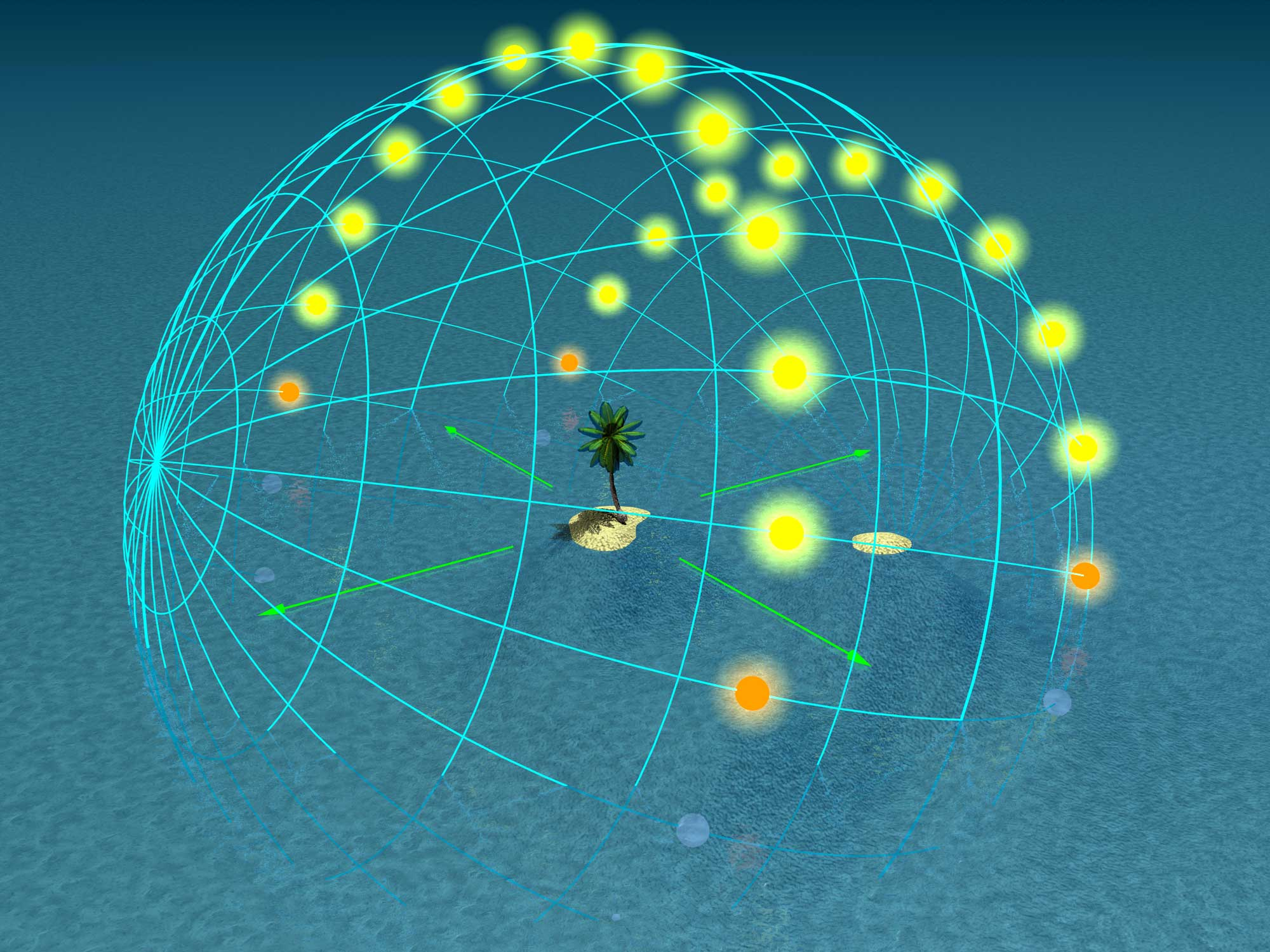
20° latitude

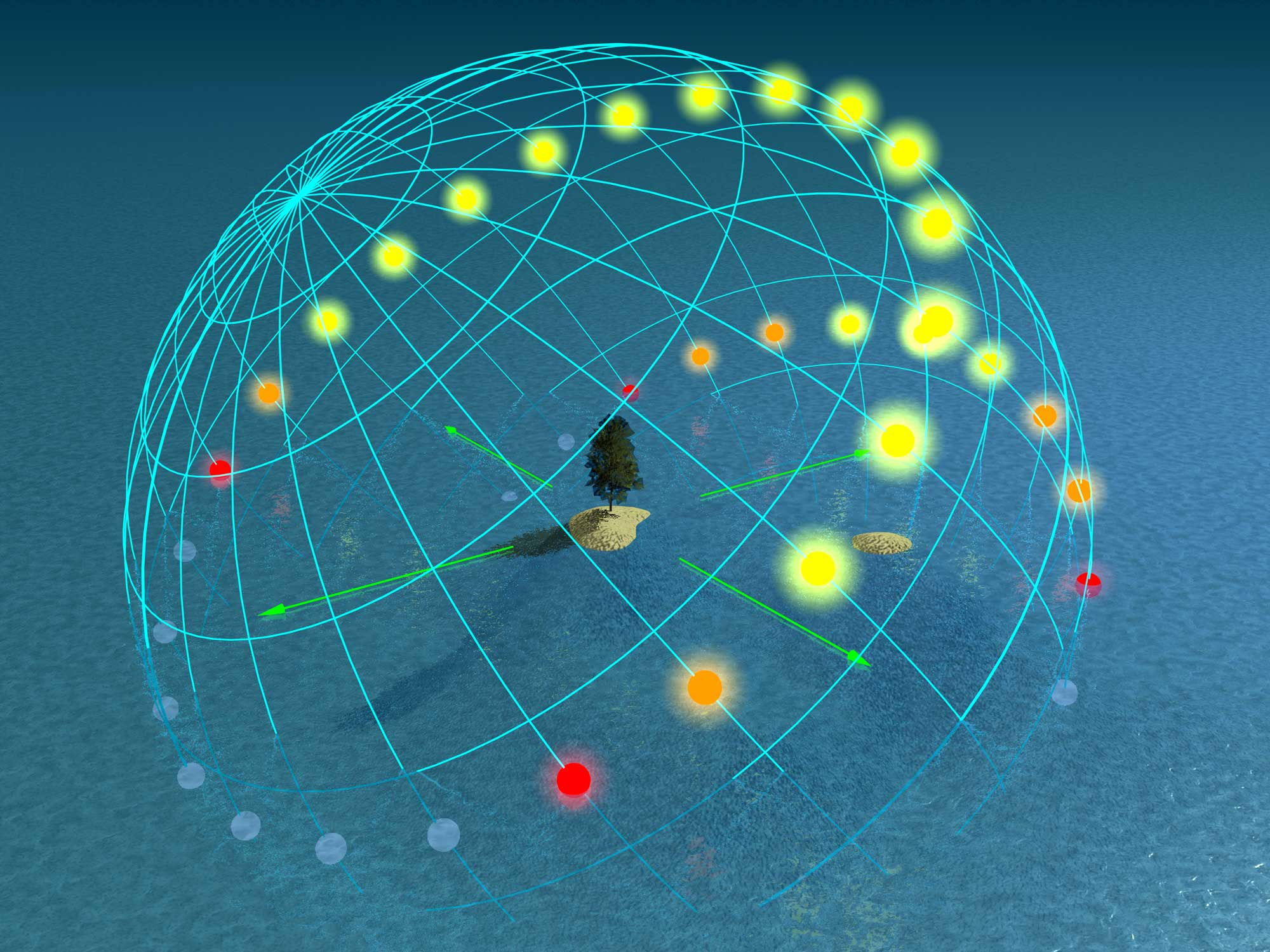
50° latitude

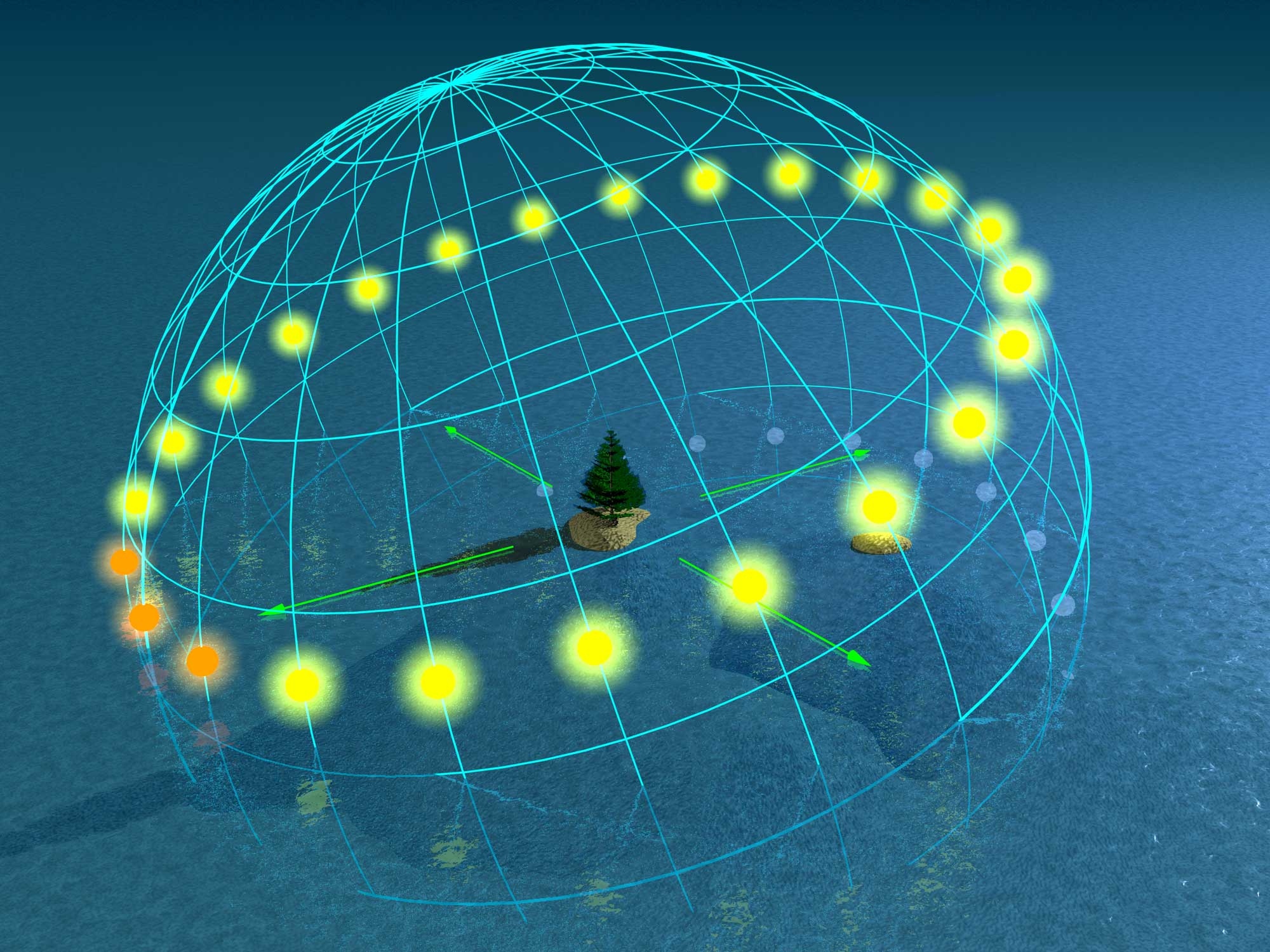
70° latitude

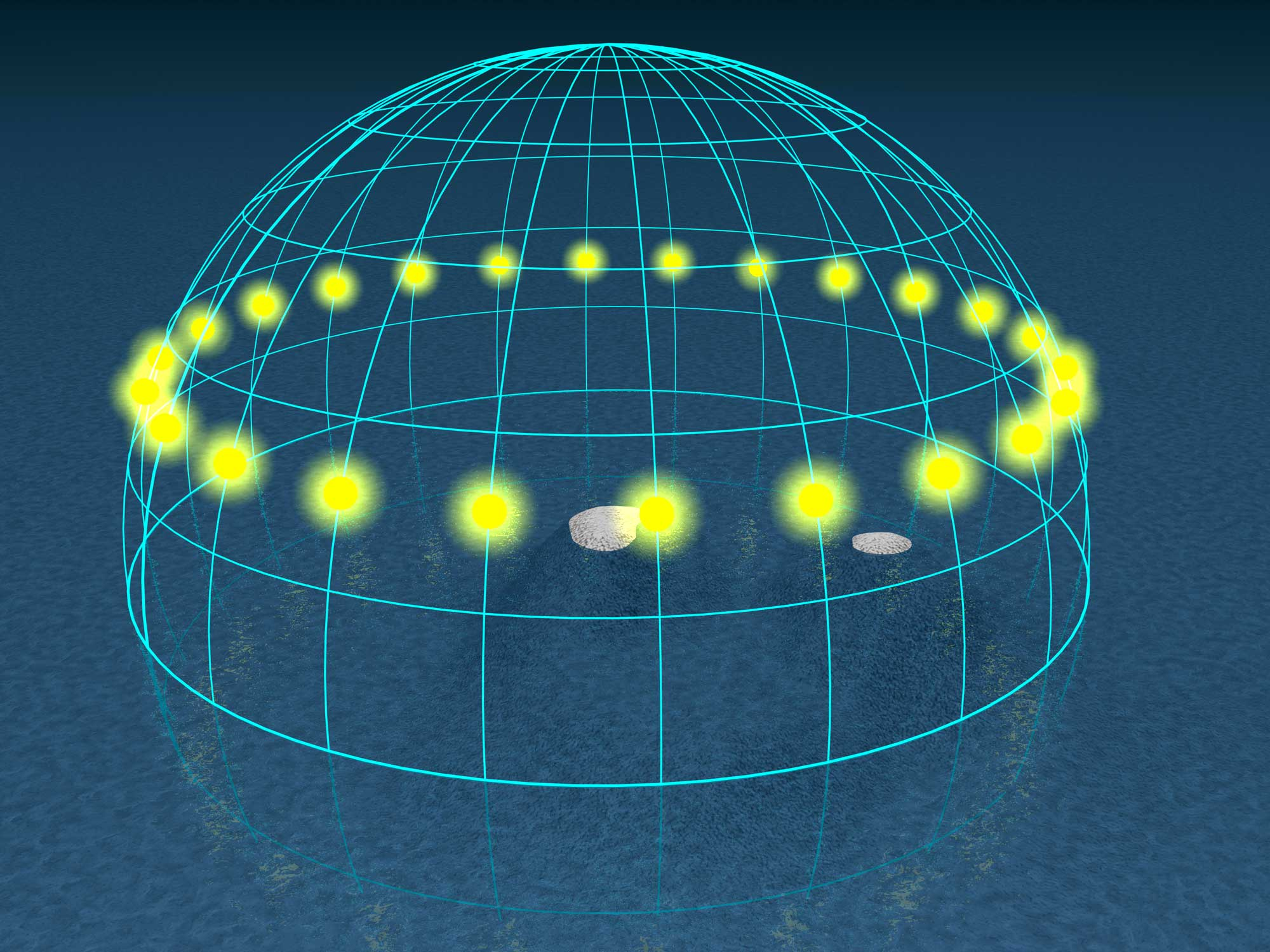
90° latitude (either pole)

=== Visualization 2 ===
A 2021 publication about solar geometry first calculates the x-, y-, and z-component of the solar vector, which is a unit vector with its tail fixed at the observer's location and its head kept pointing toward the Sun, and then uses the components to calculate the solar zenith angle and solar azimuth angle. The calculated solar vector at 1-hour step for a full year for both daytime and nighttime can be used to visualize the Sun path effectively.

In the following figures, the origin of the coordinate system is the observer's location, x-positive is East, y-positive is North, and z-positive is upward; at North Pole, y-negative is tangent to the prime meridian; at South Pole, y-positive is tangent to the prime meridian; z-positive is daytime, and z-negative is nighttime; the time step is 1 hour.

Each "8" pattern in all figures is an analemma corresponding to a specific hour of every day of the year; all the 24 hours on a specific day of the year depict the sun path of that day.

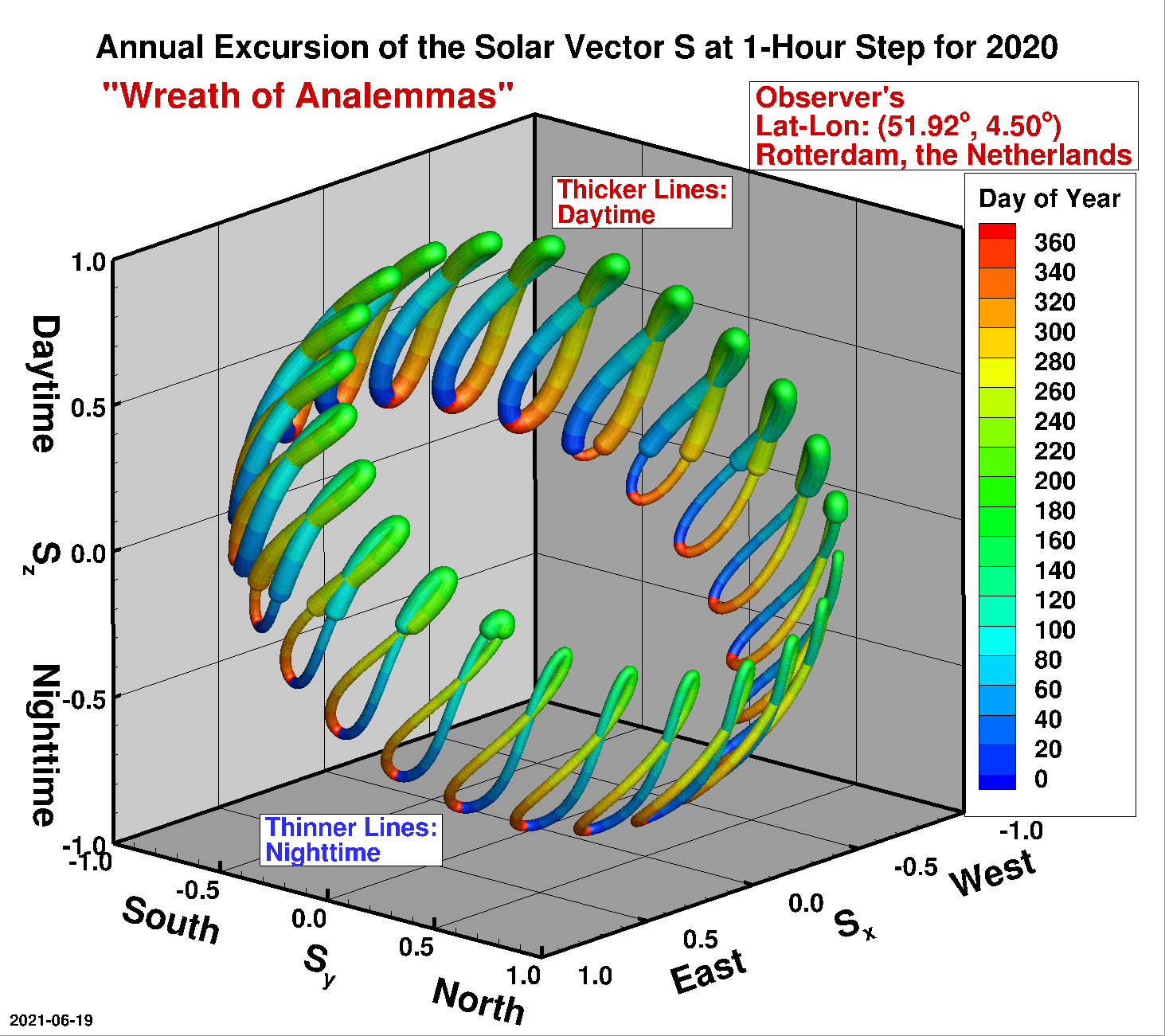
Rotterdam, the Netherlands

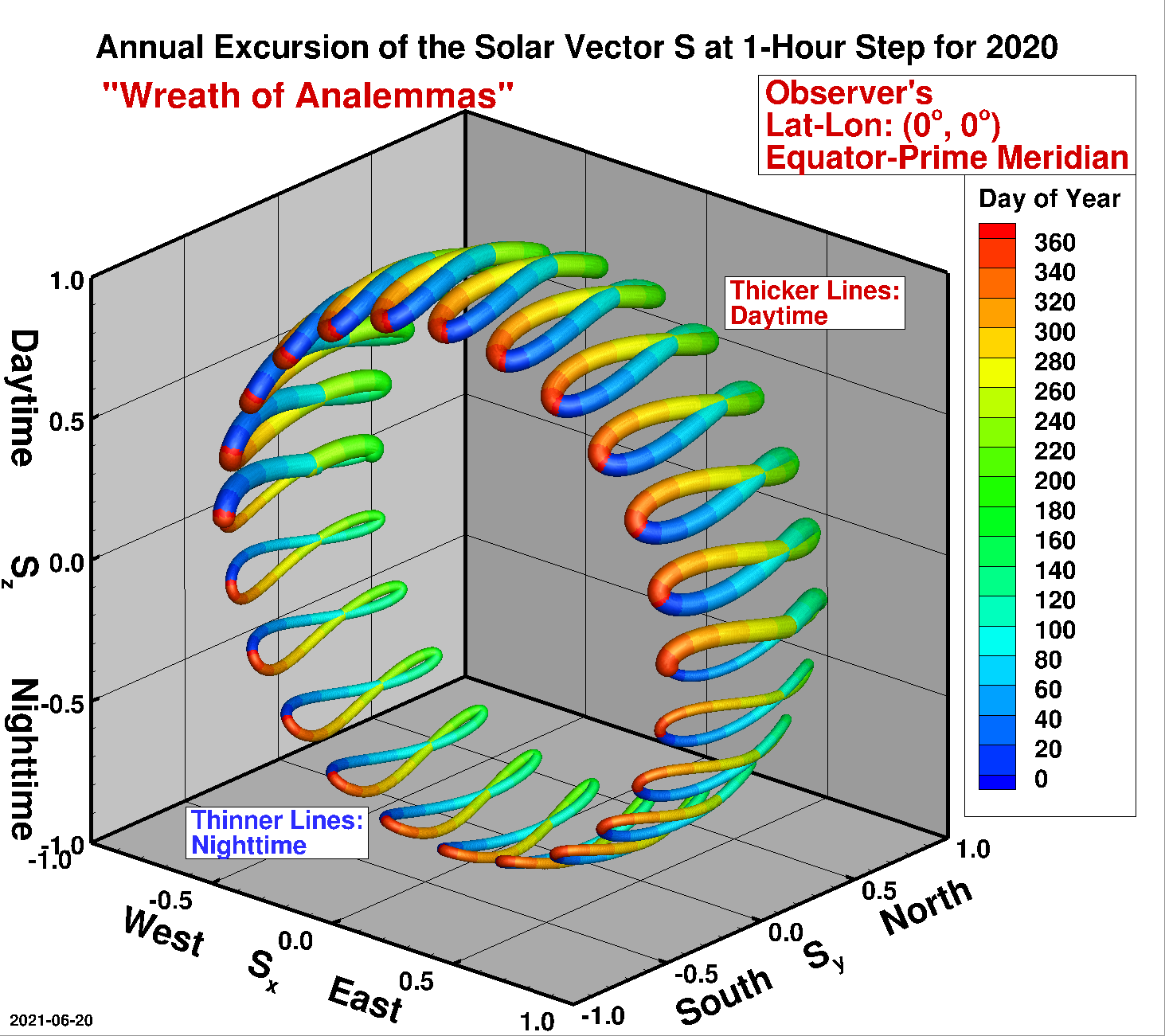
Equator, Prime Meridian

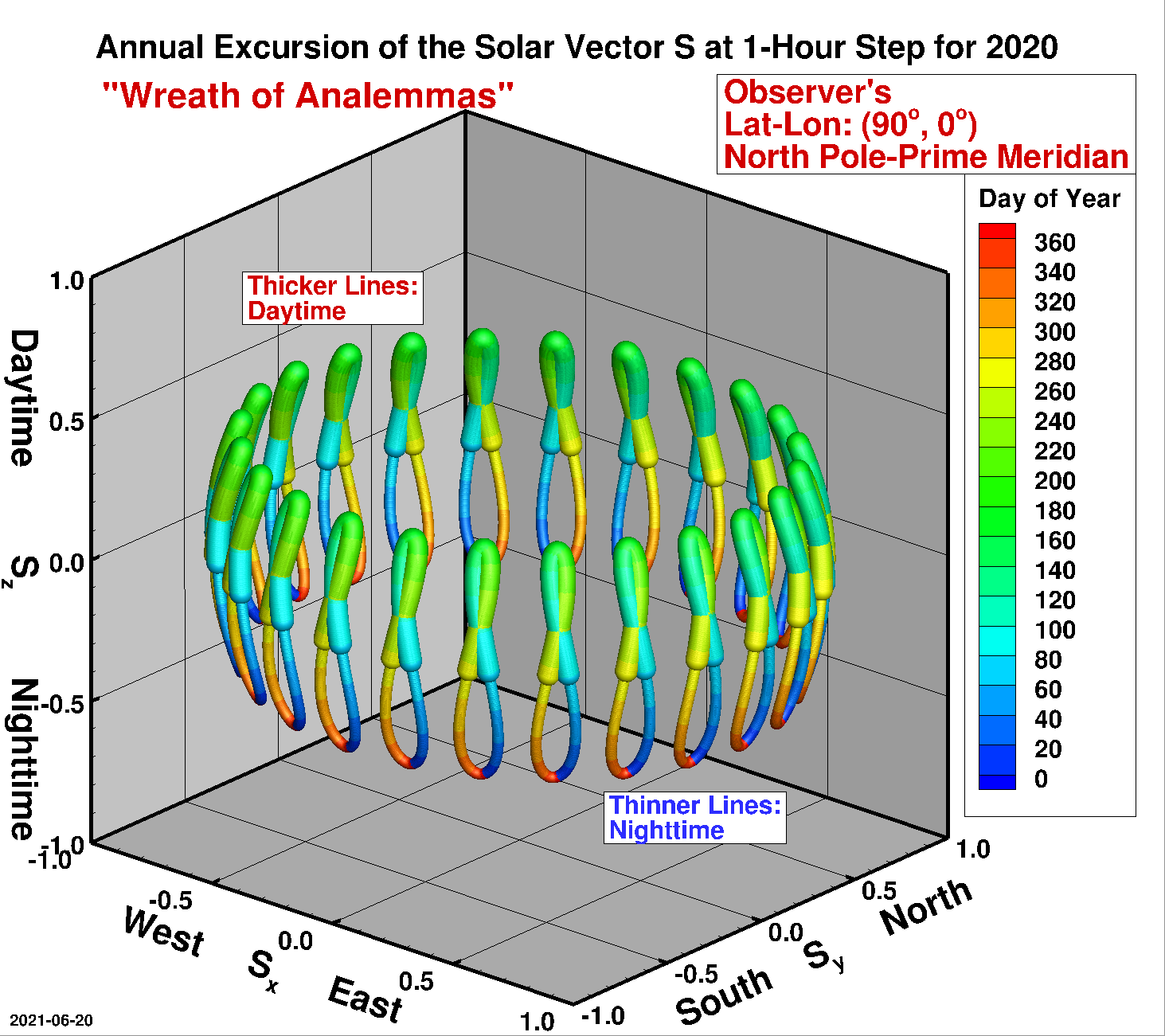
North Pole

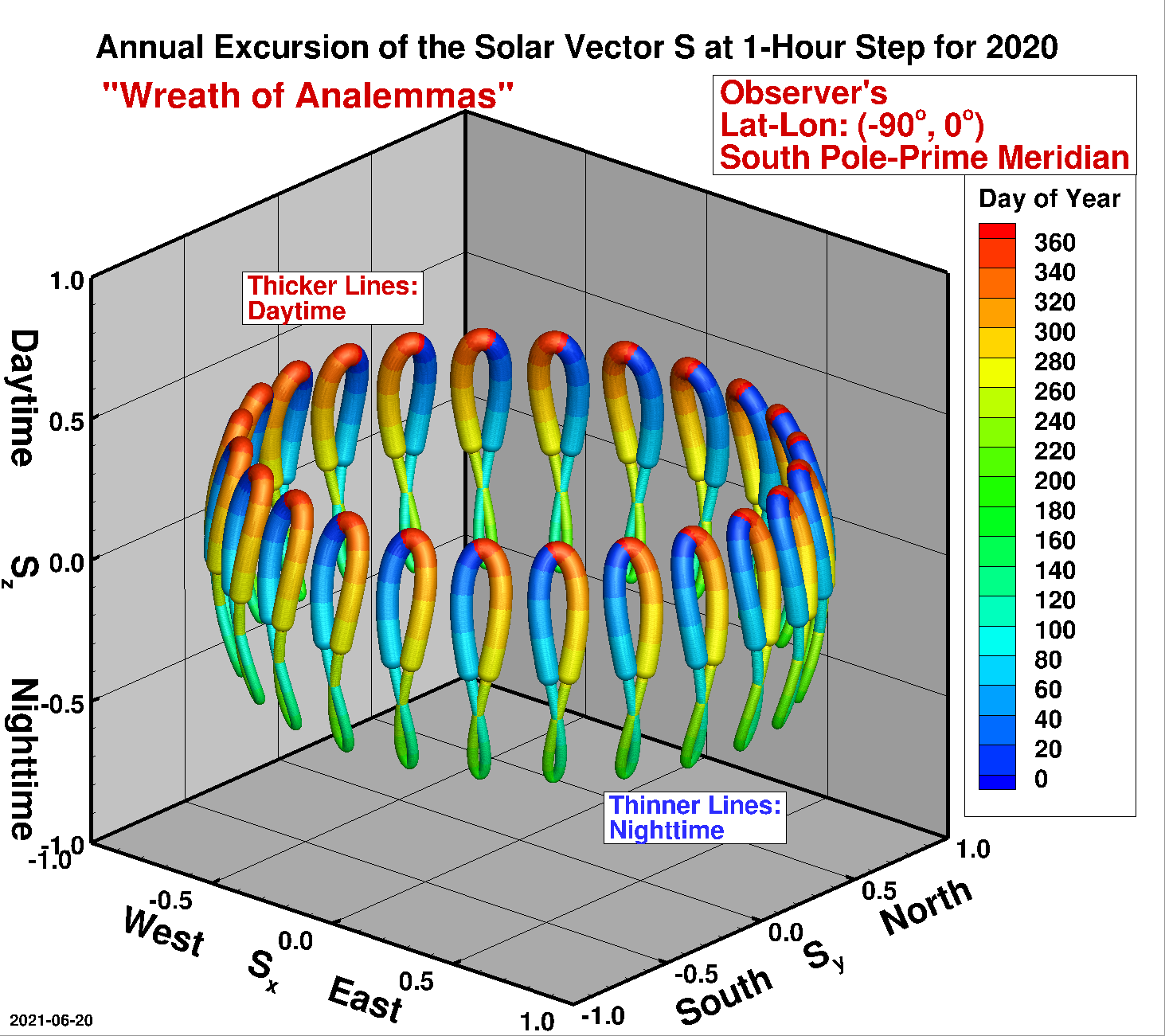
South Pole

== Gallery ==
The sun path polar graphs here represent the Equator, the Tropics, the Tropic of Cancer, mid-latitude, latitude of Rotterdam, the Arctic circle, the Arctic region, the North pole, and the conjugate latitude of Rotterdam in Southern Hemisphere. The polar axis in each graph represents the solar zenith angle in degree, and the solar azimuth angle follows the North-clockwise convention. The labeled hours, when treated as local solar time, can be applied to any longitude for the labeled latitude. The paths shown in each graph are for January 21 through December 2026. Each hourly contour forms a figure resembling the number "8", and it is an analemma corresponding to that hour.

One feature that can be observed is that if two days are equidistant from the summer solstice, or from the winter solstice for that matter, on opposite sides (for instance, the two days May 21, 2026 and July 21, 2026) their sun paths practically overlap.

In northern summer, namely, from March equinox to September equinox, out of the tropics, the Sun rises somewhere to the north of the east in the northern semicircle, then moves to the southern semicircle, and later moves back to the northern semicircle and sets somewhere to the north of the west. This means that if you have a house, or a bifacial solar voltaic panel, oriented north–south, both the front and rear sides experience hours receiving direct solar radiation. Within the tropics, depending on whether the latitude in question is higher or lower than the declination of the Sun, the Sun may or may not travel between the northern and southern semicircles. In northern summer, the length of daytime is longer than 12 hours.

In northern winter, namely, from September equinox to March equinox, the Sun stays in the southern semicircle throughout the day at all latitudes. The length of daytime is less than 12 hours.

The case for southern summer is a mirror image of the northern summer about the Equator, as illustrated in the last figure in the gallery.

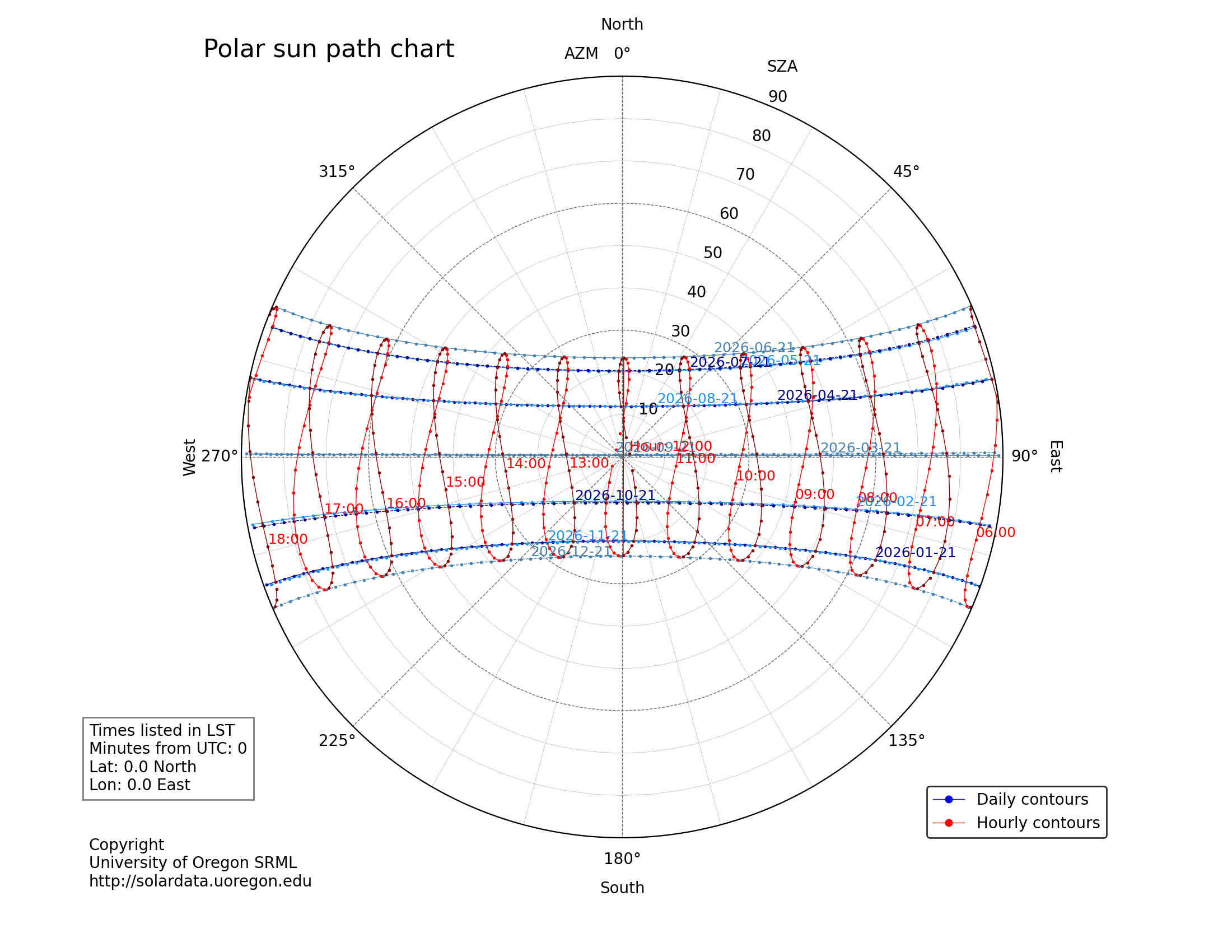
Sun Path for Lat-Lon (0.0º, 0.0º), Equator

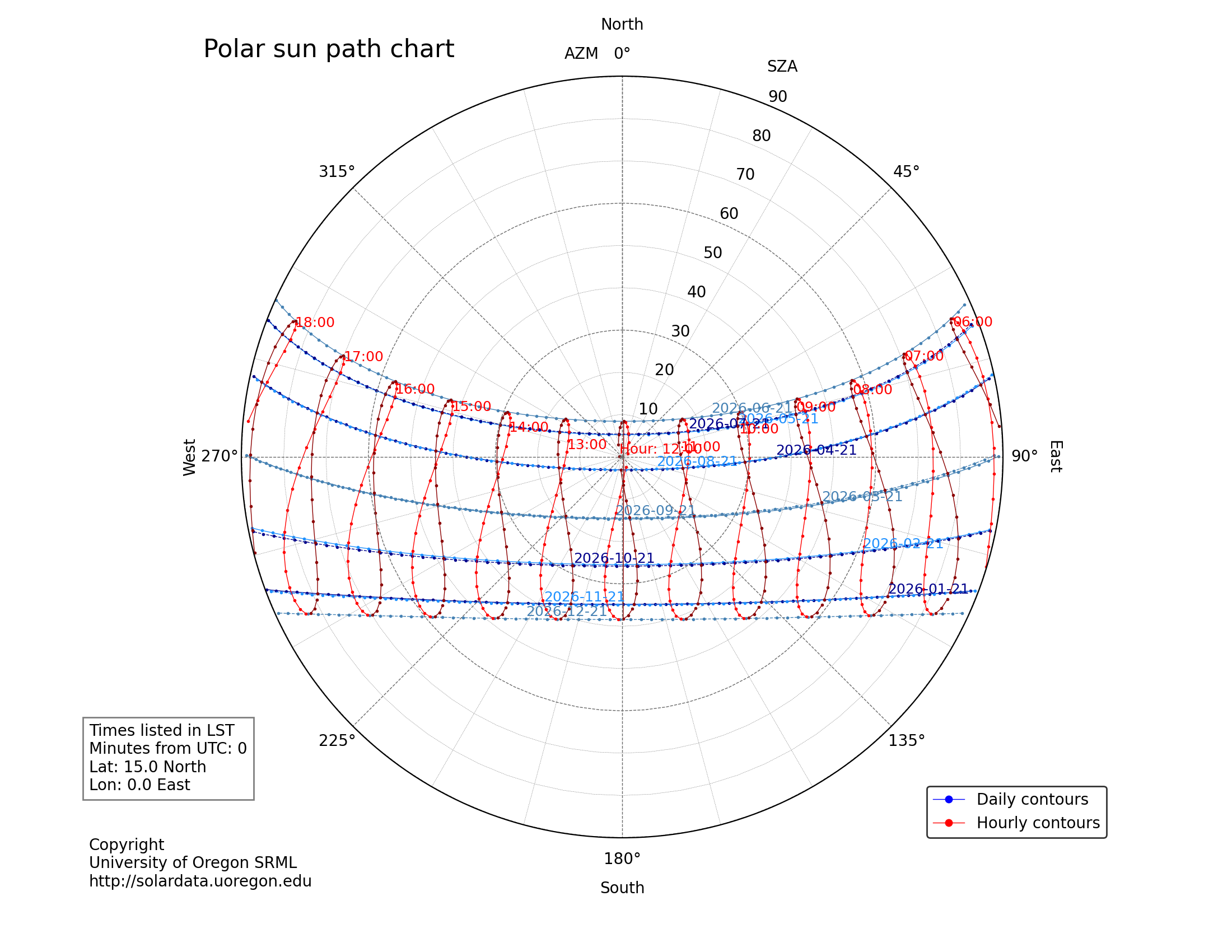
Sun Path for Lat-Lon (15.0º, 0.0º), the Tropics

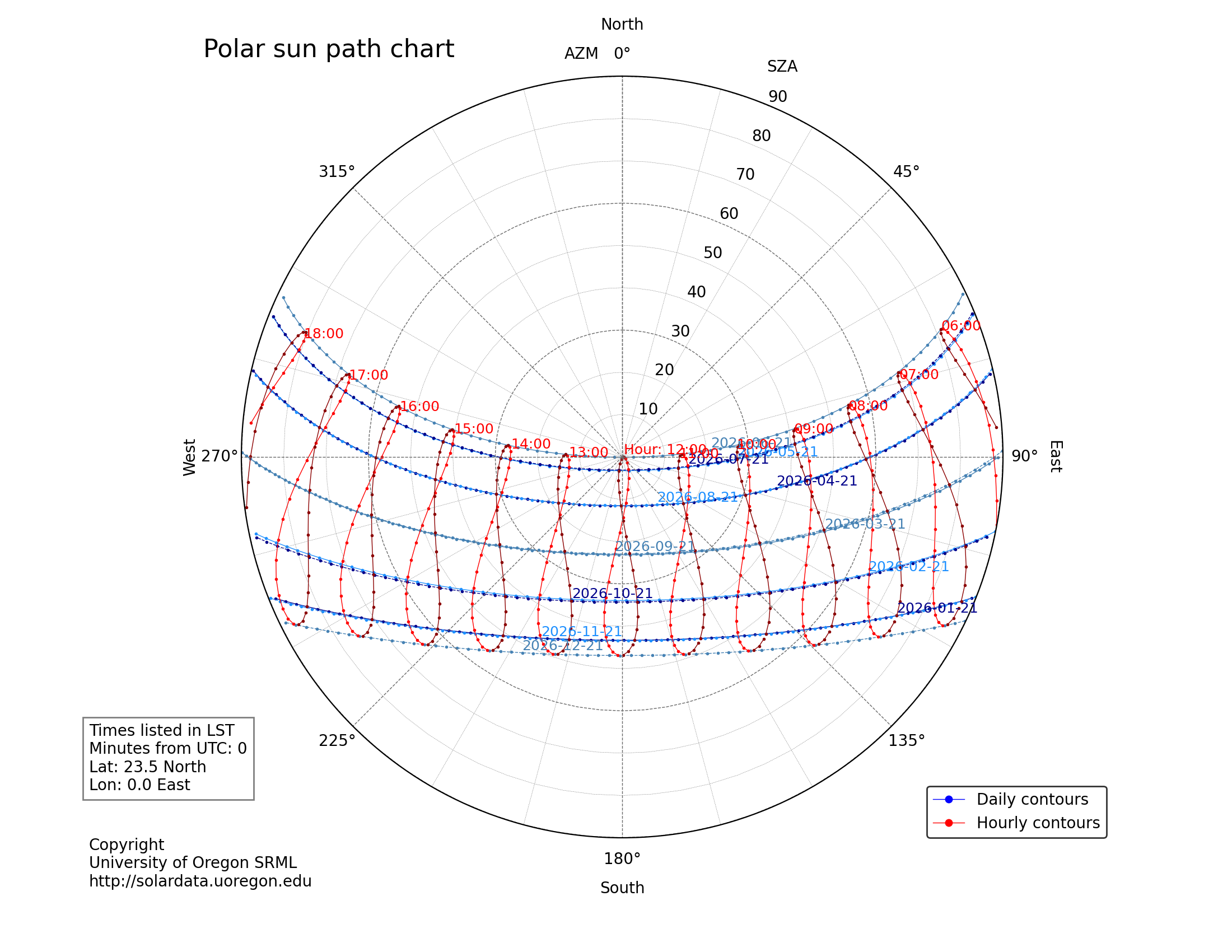
Sun Path for Lat-Lon (23.5º, 0.0º), the Tropic of Cancer

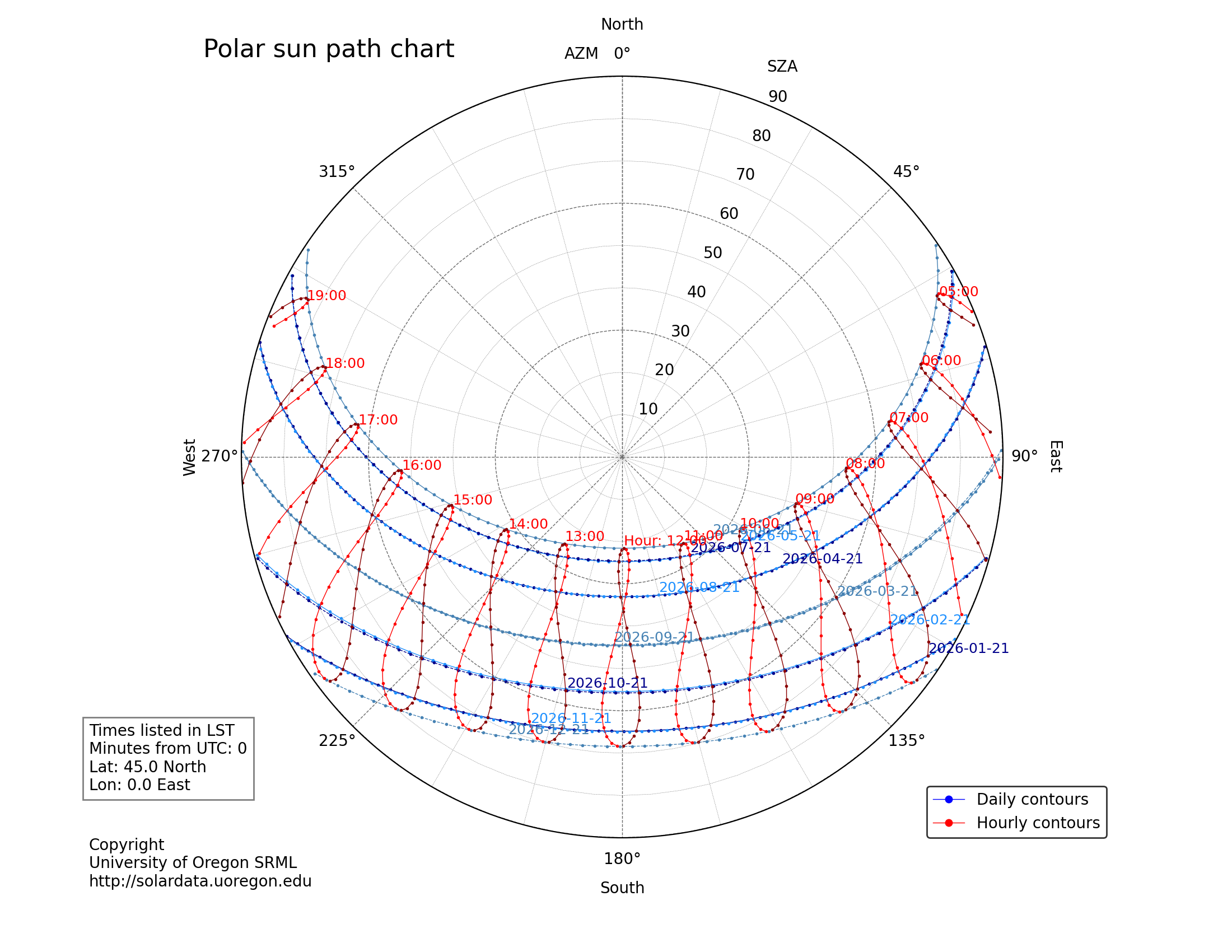
Sun Path for Lat-Lon (45.0º, 0.0º), mid-latitude

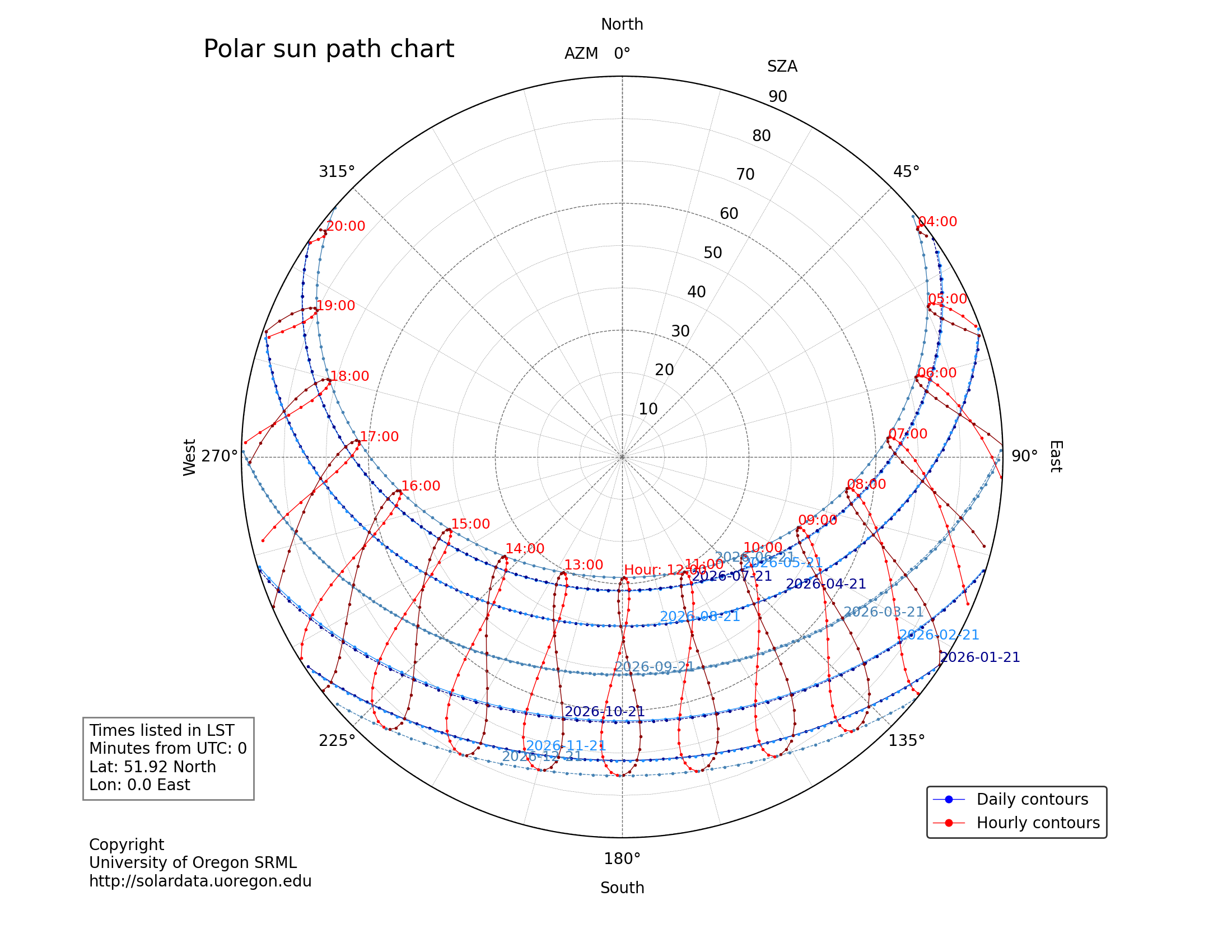
Sun Path for Lat-Lon (51.92º, 0.0º), latitude of Rotterdam

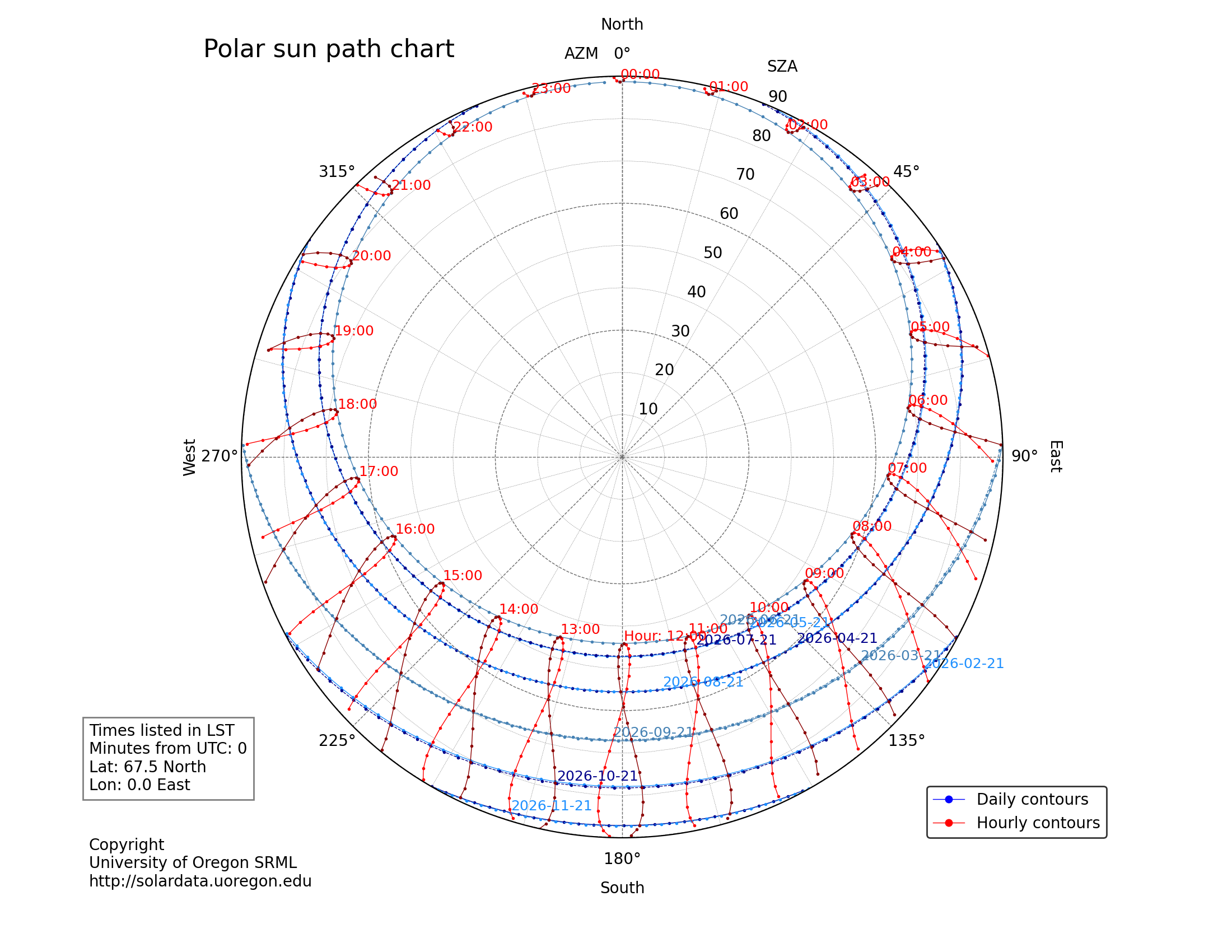
Sun Path for Lat-Lon (67.5º, 0.0º), the Arctic circle

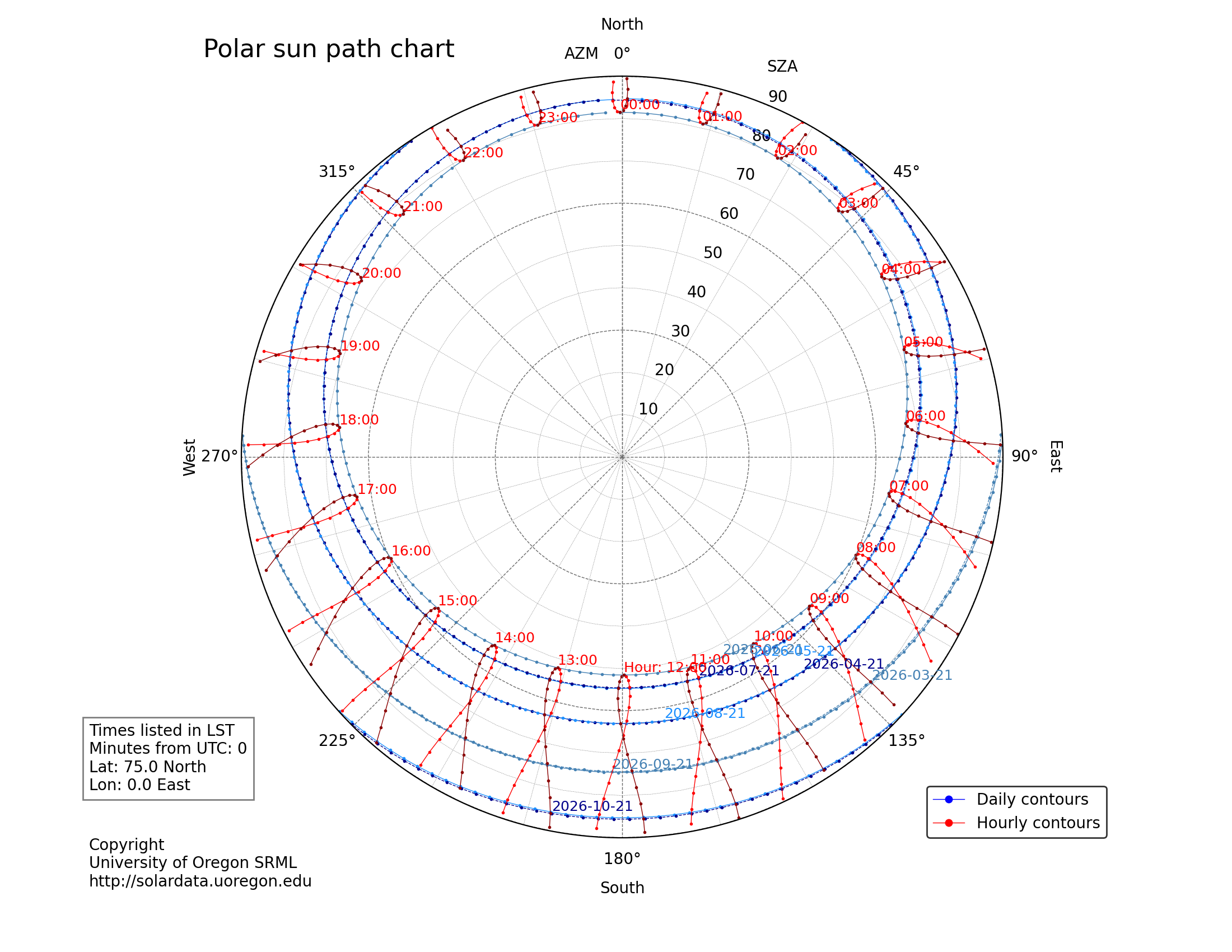
Sun Path for Lat-Lon (75.0º, 0.0º), the Arctic region

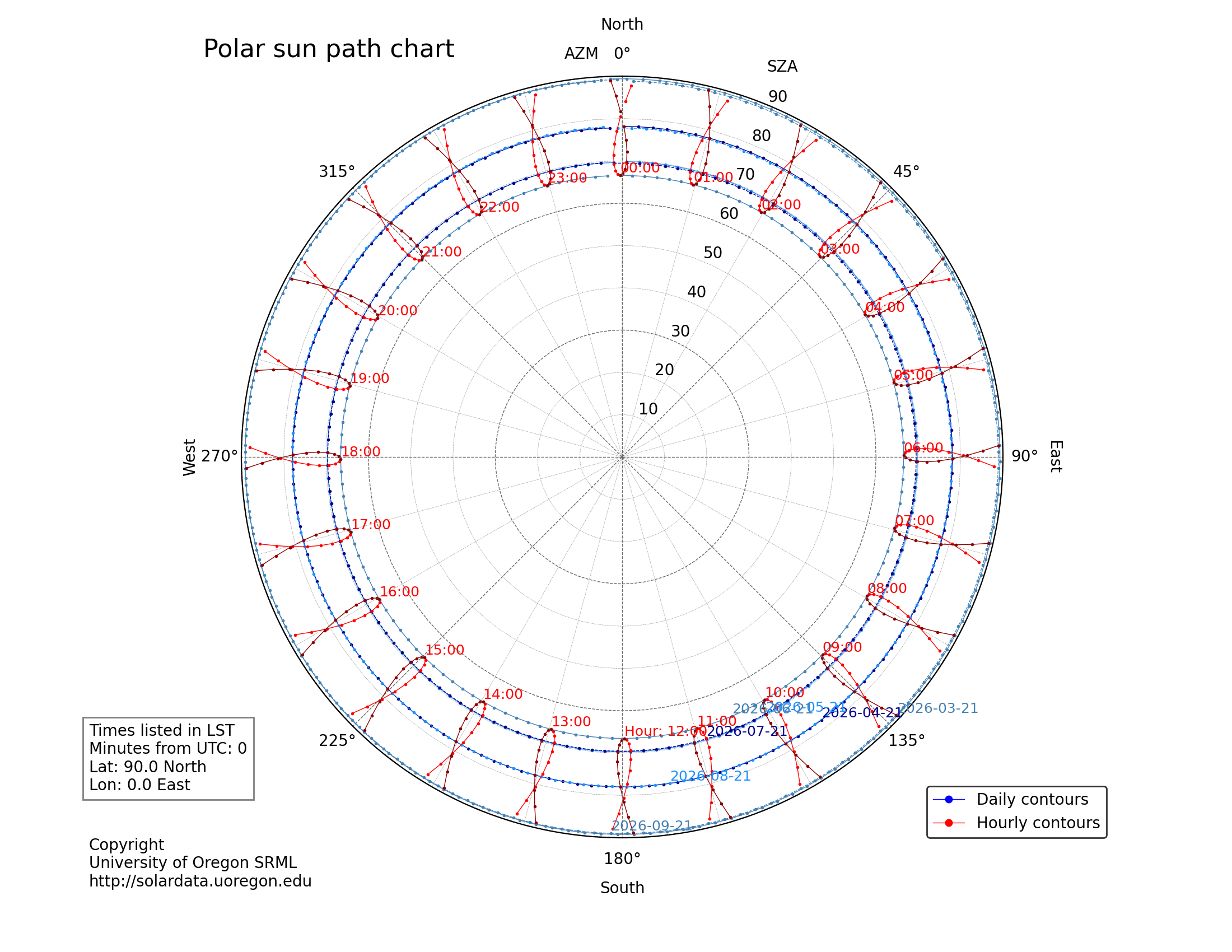
Sun Path for Lat-Lon (90.0º, 0.0º), North pole

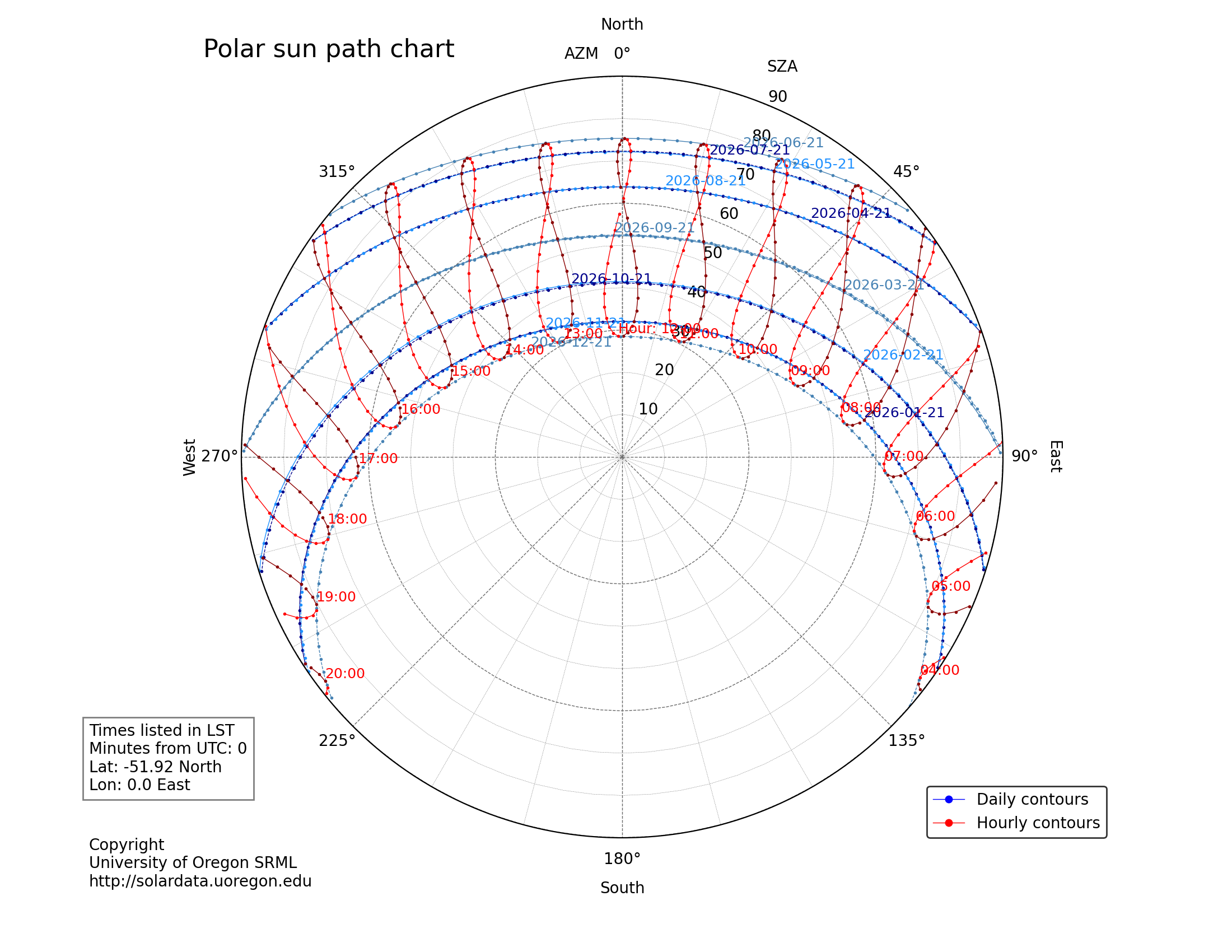
Sun Path for Lat-Lon (-51.92º, 0.0º), conjugate latitude of Rotterdam in Southern Hemisphere

== See also ==
- Daylighting (architecture)
- Daytime length
- Effect of Sun angle on climate
- Heliostat
- Photovoltaic mounting system § Orientation and inclination
- Pyranometer
- Pyrheliometer
- Solar access
- Sun chart
