= Non-linear media =

Non-linear media is a form of audiovisual media that can be interacted with by the viewer, such as by selecting television shows to watch through a video on demand type service, by playing a video game, by clicking through a website, or by interacting through social media. Non-linear media is a move away from traditional linear media in which content is selected by the publisher to be consumed and is then done so passively. There is no single specific form of non-linear media; what might be considered non-linear changes as technology changes. Following the development and rise of digital non-linear media, the retronym linear (used in linear television, linear channels, etc.) was introduced to refer to programmed broadcasting.

== Television ==
The model of traditional linear television programming is for a schedule of shows to be selected by the broadcaster and then viewed at a set time. In this model, the viewer cannot fast forward through the programming or choose to watch it at a later time. Conversely, non-linear television can be considered to be any method or technology that allows viewers to select which shows they watch and when they watch them. The ability to watch a show at any time is referred to as time shifted viewing; this can be achieved by either the consumer recording shows with a device such as a PVR for later viewing, or by the publisher providing content to be selected at will at the viewer's convenience.

Non-linear content is often viewed on a device other than a television, such as a personal computer or a smartphone. Video on demand (VOD) content can be transmitted over the internet via streaming services such as Netflix, Hulu, Starz, or Amazon Video, or it can be provided by a television provider as an additional option on top of their linear programming. Many publishers of content now offer streaming of programs through their own websites, though sometimes the catalog that is offered will be curated in some way, such as by providing only recently released episodes. Video may also be downloaded – legally or illegally – through a peer-to-peer network such as BitTorrent, or it may be directly downloaded from a video hosting website.

As internet speeds and the number of supported devices have increased, so has the number of people who consume non-linear media. This is evidenced by the rising popularity of over-the-top (OTT) streaming services. In 2015, the television network CBS expected that by the year 2020, 50 percent of all television content would be viewed in a non-linear fashion.

== Music and radio ==
Like other forms of non-linear media such as television, non-linear radio allows listeners to choose and listen to music and talk shows on a schedule determined by the listener. Online music streaming services such as Spotify or Deezer are non-linear in that they allow listeners to create playlists from a library of music offered by a website;. Similarly, podcasts offer the ability to download or stream prerecorded shows similar to those that are traditionally broadcast over the radio waves. Some traditional radio stations allow their shows to be downloaded on demand after the show has aired over the air.

== See also ==
- Interactive fiction
- Nonlinear gameplay
