= Analemmatic sundial =

Sundial where the gnomon must be moved

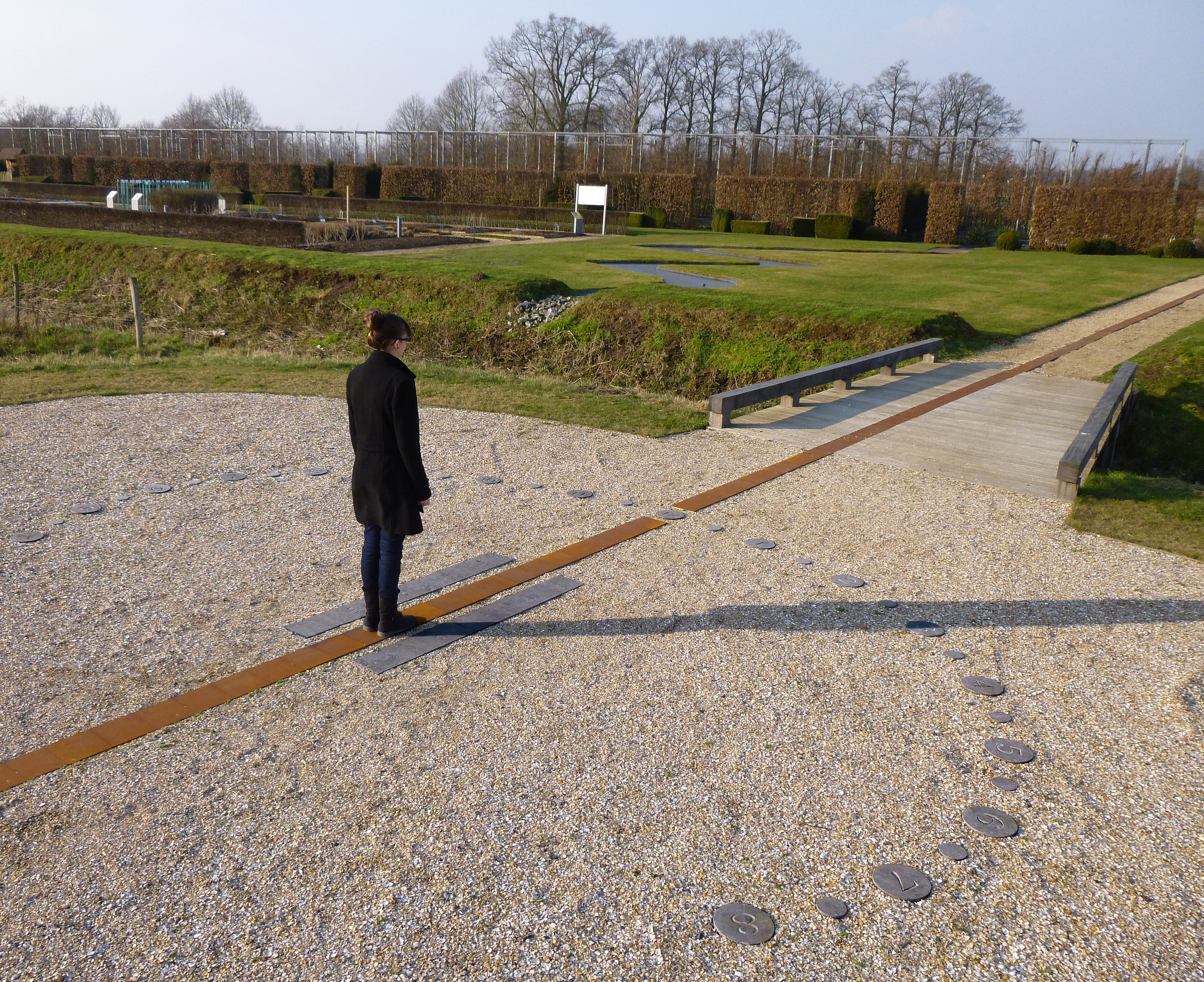
Analemmatic sundial on a meridian line in the garden of the Herkenrode Abbey in Hasselt (Flanders in Belgium)

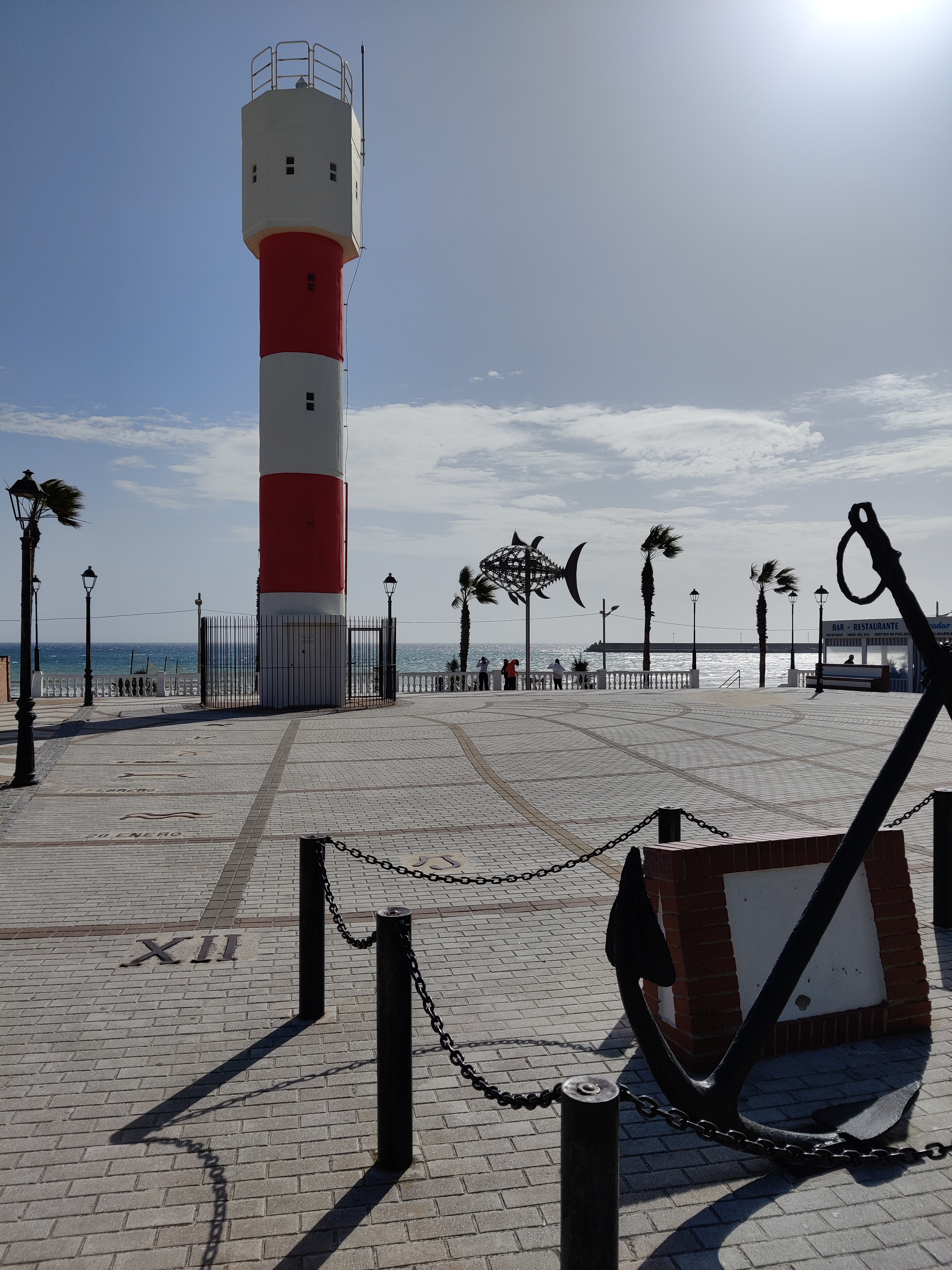
Analemmatic sundial in which the Barbate lighthouse forms the gnomon of the dial – instead of moving the gnomon, there are multiple dials for different dates

Analemmatic sundials are a type of horizontal sundial that has a vertical gnomon and hour markers positioned in an elliptical pattern. The gnomon is not fixed and must change position daily to accurately indicate time of day. The time of day is read by the position of the shadow on the ellipse. Like most sundials, analemmatic sundials mark solar time rather than clock time.

== Description ==
An analemmatic sundial is completely defined by:

- The size of its ellipse (chosen by the designer).
- The latitude of its location (determines the location of the hour markers on the ellipse).
- The declination of the sun (determines the daily gnomon position).

Analemmatic sundials are sometimes designed with a human as the gnomon. In this case the size of the hour marker ellipse is constrained by human height and the latitude of the sundial location, since the human gnomon shadow must fall on the hour marker ellipse to accurately indicate the time of day. Human gnomon analemmatic sundials are not practical at lower latitudes where a human shadow is quite short during the summer months. A 66-inch tall person casts a 4-inch shadow at 27 degrees latitude on the summer solstice.

The use of the adjective analemmatic to describe this class of sundial can be misleading, because there is no use of the equation of time or the analemma in the design of an analemmatic sundial. Mayall refers to the analemmatic sundial as "the so-called Analemmatic Dial", implying a lack of connection to the analemma. The dial of Brou in front of the church of Brou in Bourg-en-Bresse, France is an example of the erroneous use of the analemma in the construction of an analemmatic sundial. Rohr states "The gnomon is displaced on the short axis of the ellipse and not on the meridian, whose presence here in the shape of an 8 is a mistake."

== Construction ==
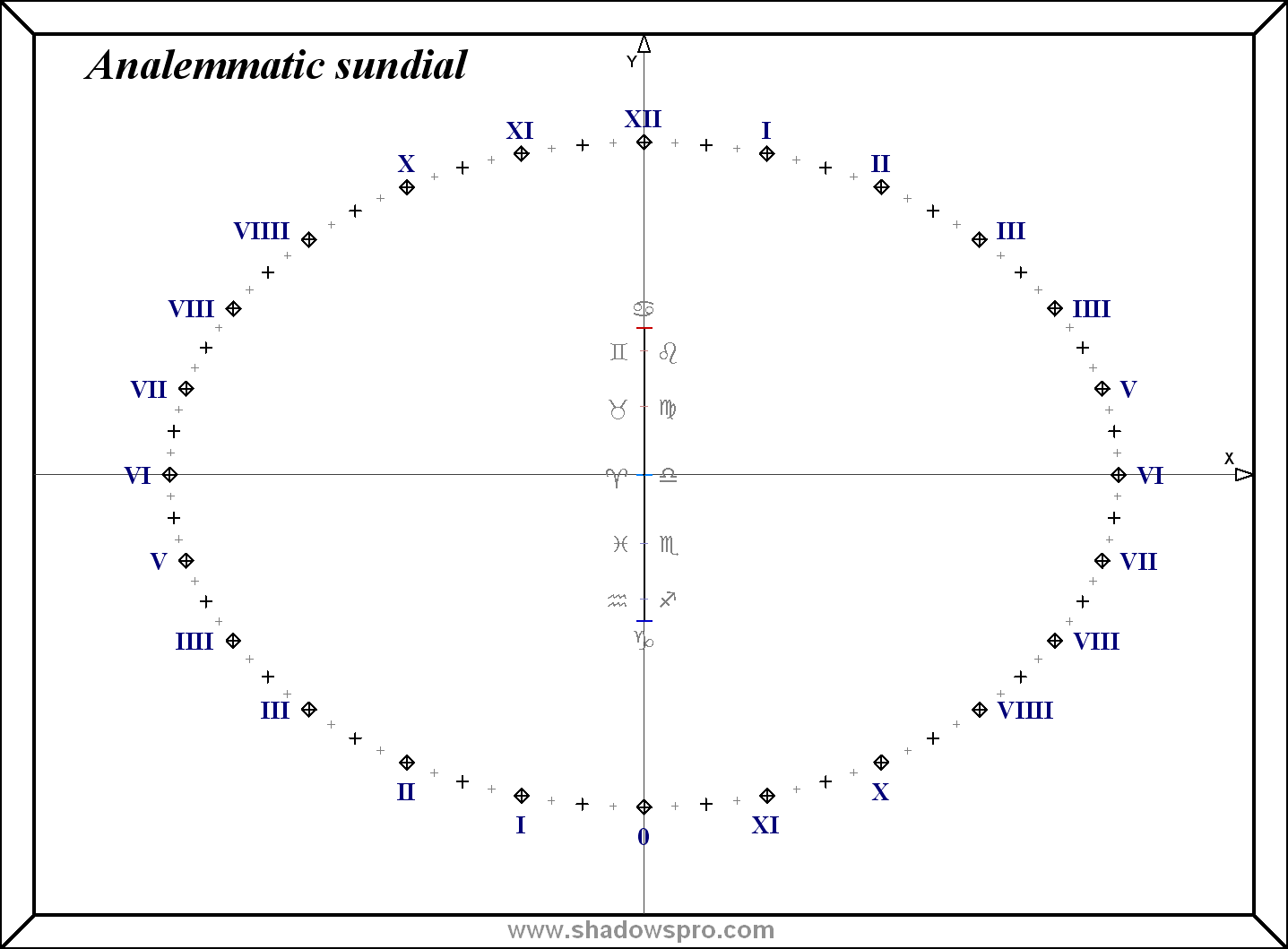
Horizontal analemmatic sundial for 44°29' N drawn with Shadows Expert software. It shows local time

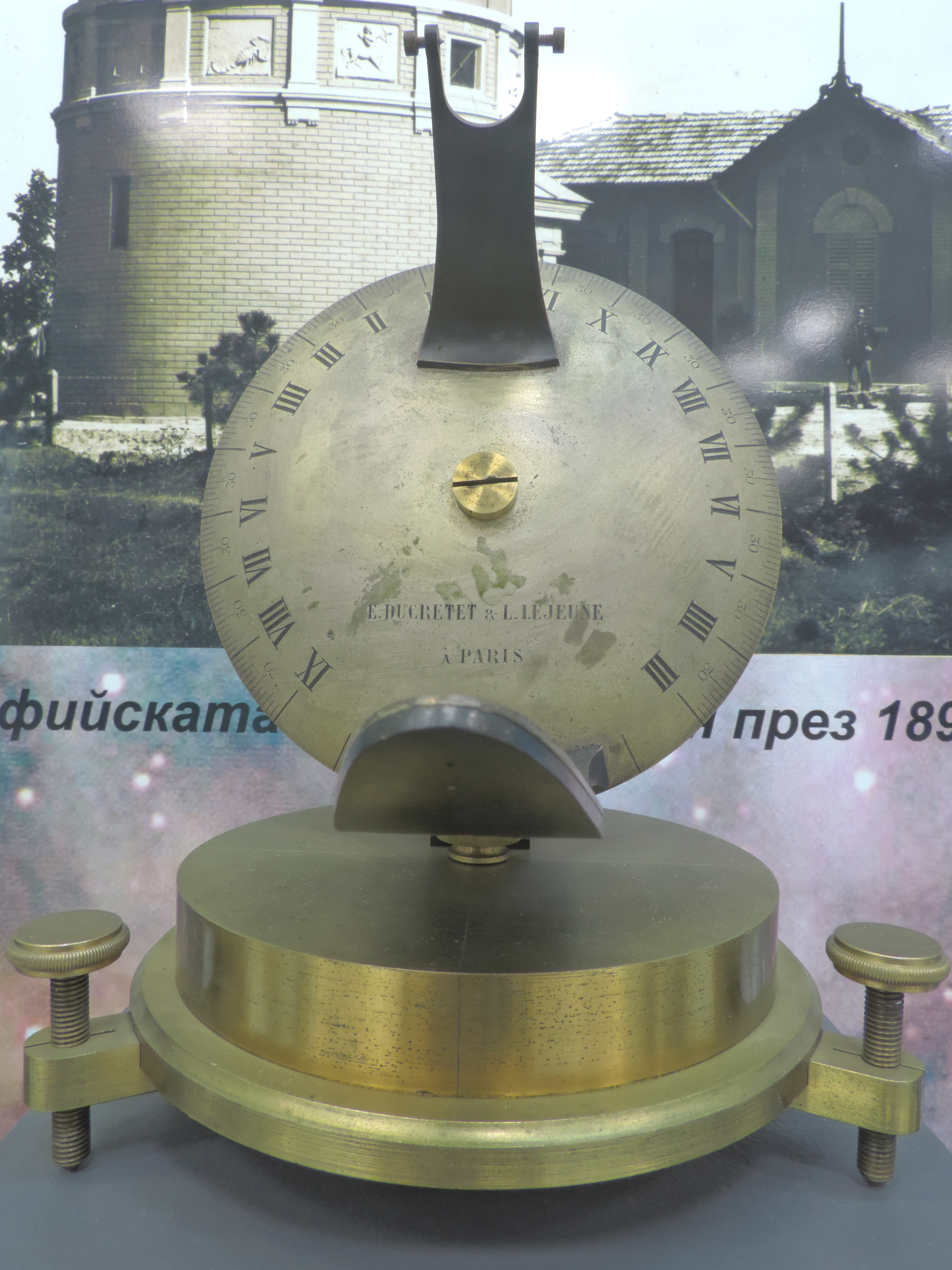
The terminology of sundial classification can be misleading. Although it features an analemma, this analemmic heliochronometer, end of 19th century, is not an analemmatic sundial - refer to the definition given in the text. Exhibit of the National Polytechnic Museum, Sofia

An analemmatic sundial uses a vertical gnomon and its hour lines are the vertical projection of the hour lines of a circular equatorial sundial onto a flat plane. Therefore, the analemmatic sundial is an ellipse, where the short axis is aligned north–south and the long axis is aligned east–west. The noon hour line points true North, whereas the hour lines for 6am and 6pm point due West and East, respectively; the ratio of the short to long axes equals the sine sin(Φ) of the local geographical latitude, denoted Φ. All the hour lines converge to a single centre; the angle θ of a given hour line with the noon hour is given by the formula

$$\tan \theta = \frac{\tan (15^{\circ} \times t)}{\sin \phi }$$

where t is the time (in hours) before or after noon.

However, the vertical gnomon does not always stand at the centre of the hour lines; rather, to show the correct time, the gnomon must be moved daily northwards from the centre by the distance

$$Y = W \cos \phi \tan \delta \,$$

where W is half the width of the ellipse and δ is the Sun's declination at that time of year. The declination measures how far the sun is above the celestial equator; at the equinoxes, δ=0 whereas it equals roughly ±23.5° at the summer and winter solstices.

Declination of the sun
month	Jan	Feb	Mar	Apr	May	Jun	Jul	Aug	Sep	Oct	Nov	Dec
declination	-23.13	-17.3	-8	4.25	15	22	23.00	18	8.50	-2.9	-14	-21.7
	Mean values on the first of the month. This averages out the effect of leap years.											

== See also ==
- Analemma
