= Equation clock =

Clock

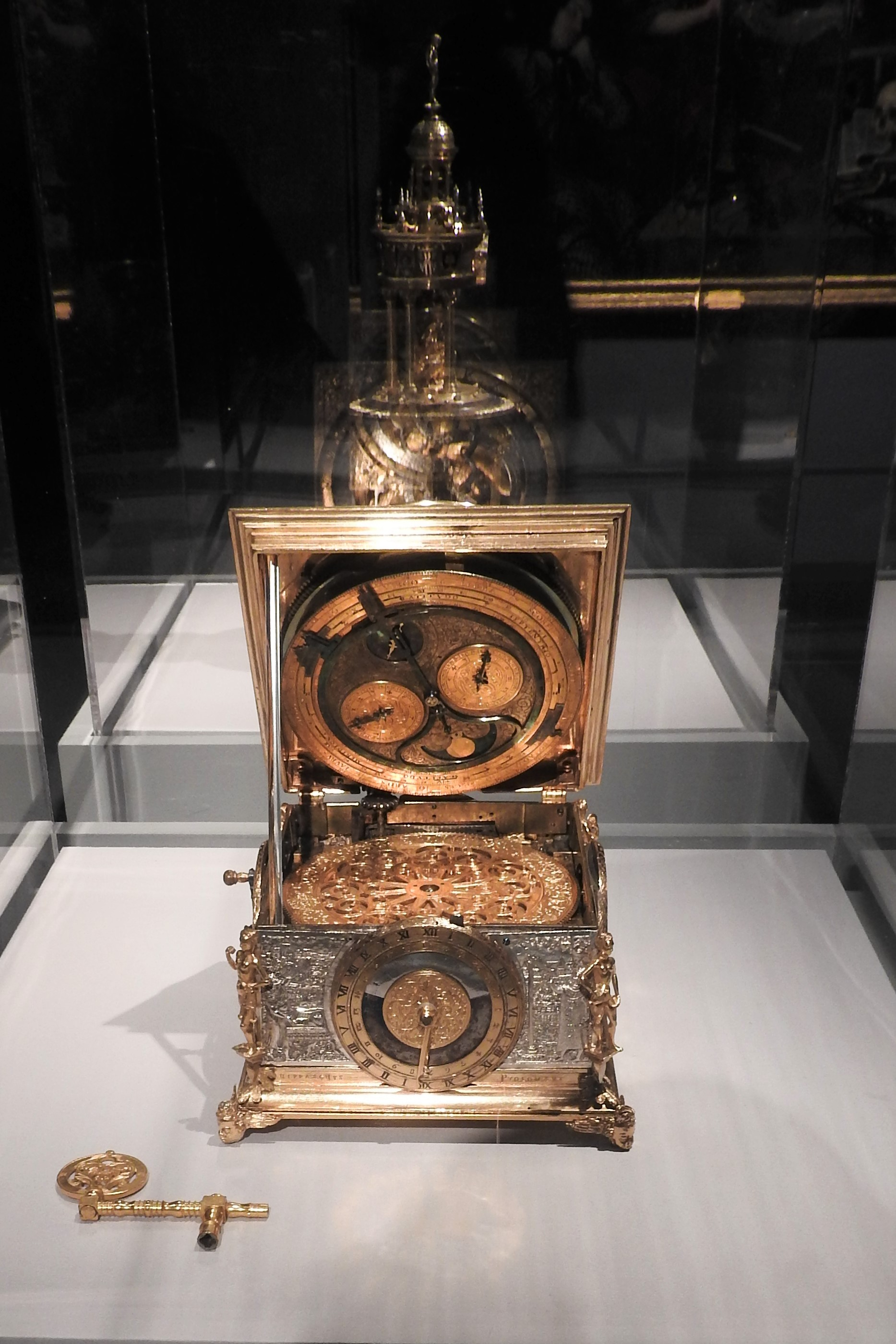
Made in Germany, 1591

An equation clock is a mechanical clock which includes a mechanism that simulates the equation of time, so that the user can read or calculate solar time, as would be shown by a sundial. The first accurate clocks, controlled by pendulums, were patented by Christiaan Huyghens in 1657. For the next few decades, people were still accustomed to using sundials, and wanted to be able to use clocks to find solar time. Equation clocks were invented to fill this need.

Early equation clocks have a pointer that moves to show the equation of time on a dial or scale. The clock itself runs at constant speed. The user calculates solar time by adding the equation of time to the clock reading. Later equation clocks, made in the 18th century, perform the compensation automatically, so the clock directly shows solar time. Some of them also show mean time, which is often called "clock time".

The annual variation of the equation of time. Above the axis, sundial (solar) time is ahead of clock (mean) time, and vice versa.

== Simulation mechanisms ==
All equation clocks include a mechanism that simulates the equation of time, so a lever moves, or a shaft rotates, in a way that represents the variations of the equation of time as the year progresses. There are two frequently-used types of mechanism:

=== Cam and lever mechanism ===
In this type of mechanism, a shaft is driven by the clock so it rotates once a year, at constant speed. The shaft carries a cam, which is approximately "kidney shaped" such that its radius is essentially a graph of the annual variation of the equation of time. A follower and lever rest against the cam, so that as the cam rotates the lever moves in a way that represents the changing equation of time. This lever drives other components in the clock.

=== Double shaft mechanism ===
To a close approximation, the equation of time can be represented as the sum of two sine waves, one with a period of one year and the other with a period of six months, with the relative phase varying very slowly (marginally noticeable over the course of a century). See the explanation in Equation of time for more detail.

The double shaft mechanism has two shafts rotating at constant speeds: one turns once a year, and the other twice a year. Cranks or pins attached to the two shafts move the two ends of a combining lever (sometimes referred to as a whippletree) sinusoidally; if the dimensions are chosen correctly, the midpoint of the rod moves in a way that simulates the equation of time.

== Types of equation clock ==
During the period when equation clocks were made and used, all clocks were made by hand. No two are exactly alike. Many equation clocks also have other features, such as displays of the phase of the moon or the times of sunrise and sunset. Leaving aside such additions, there are four different ways in which the clocks function. The following paragraphs are intended, not as detailed descriptions of individual clocks, but as illustrations of the general principles of these four different types of equation clock. The basic workings of particular clocks resemble these, but details vary. Pictures and descriptions of various equation clocks, which still exist in museums, can be accessed through the External links listed below.

=== Clocks without solar time displays ===
Many equation clocks, especially early ones, have a normal clock mechanism, showing mean time, and also a display that shows the equation of time. An equation of time simulation mechanism drives the pointer on this display. The user has to add the equation of time to clock time to calculate solar time.

=== Clocks that directly display solar time ===
Most later equation clocks, made in the 18th century, directly display solar time. Many of them also display mean time and the equation of time, but the user does not have to perform addition. Three types exist:

==== Clocks with movable minute markings ====
Clocks have been constructed in which the minute markings are on a circular plate that can be turned around the same axis as the hands. The axis passes through a hole in the centre of the plate, and the hands are in front of the plate. The minutes part of the time shown by the clock is given by the position of the minute hand relative to the markings on the plate. The hand is driven clockwise at constant speed by the clock mechanism, and the plate is turned by the mechanism that simulates the equation of time, rotating anticlockwise as the equation of time increases, and clockwise when it decreases. If the gear ratios are correct, the clock shows solar time. Mean time can also be shown by a separate, stationary set of minute markings on the dial, outside the edge of the plate. The hour display is not adjusted for the equation of time, so the hour reading is slightly approximate. This has no practical effect, since it is always easy to see which hour is correct. These clocks are mechanically simpler than the other types described below, but they have disadvantages: Solar time is difficult to read without looking closely at the minute markings, and the clock cannot be made to strike the hour in solar time.

==== Clocks with variable pendula ====
These clocks include a device at the top of the pendulum that slightly changes its effective length, so the speed of the clock varies. This device is driven by a simulation mechanism which moves to simulate the rate of change of the equation of time, rather than its actual value. For example, during the months of December and January, when the equation of time is decreasing so a sundial runs slower than usual, the mechanism makes the pendulum effectively longer than usual, so the clock runs slower and keeps pace with sundial time. At other times of the year, the pendulum is shortened, so the clock runs faster, again keeping pace with sundial time. This type of mechanism shows only solar (sundial) time. Clocks using it cannot easily be made to show mean time unless a separate clock mechanism, with its own pendulum, is included. There are some equation clocks in which this is done, but it requires the clock case to be very sturdy, to avoid coupling between the pendula. Another disadvantage of variable pendulum clocks is that the equation of time cannot be easily displayed.

==== Clocks that do mechanical addition ====
In some later equation clocks, a pendulum swings at a constant frequency, controlling a normal clock mechanism. Often, this mechanism drives a display showing mean (clock) time. However, there are additional components: an equation of time simulation mechanism as described above, and a device that automatically adds the equation of time to clock time, and drives a display that shows solar time. The addition is done by an analogue method, using a differential gear. This type of equation clock mechanism is the most versatile. Both solar and mean times can be easily and clearly displayed, as can the equation of time. Striking the hours in both kinds of time is also easy to arrange. After its invention in 1720, this mechanism became the standard one, and was used for much of the 18th century, until the demand for equation clocks ceased.

== Slow changes in the equation of time ==
Slow changes in the motions of the Earth cause gradual changes in the annual variation of the equation of time. The graph at the top of this article shows the annual variation as it is at present, around the year 2000. Many centuries in the past or future, the shape of the graph would be very different. Most equation clocks were constructed some three centuries ago, since when the change in the annual variation of the equation of time has been small, but appreciable. The clocks embody the annual variation as it was when they were made. They do not compensate for the slow changes, which were then unknown, so they are slightly less accurate now than they were when new. The greatest error from this cause is currently about one minute. Centuries in the future, if these clocks survive, the errors will be larger.

== Similar modern devices ==
Equation clocks, as such, are no longer widely used. However, components functionally the same as those in equation clocks are still used in, for example, solar trackers, which move so as to follow the movements of the Sun in the sky. Many of them do not sense the position of the Sun. Instead, they have a mechanism which rotates about a polar axis at a constant speed of 15 degrees per hour, keeping pace with the average speed of the Earth's rotation relative to the Sun. Sometimes, a digital representation of this rotation is generated, rather than physical rotation of a component. The equation of time is then added to this constant rotation, producing a rotation of the tracker that keeps pace with the apparent motion of the Sun. Generally, these machines use modern technology, involving electronics and computers, instead of the mechanical devices that were used in historic equation clocks, but the function is the same.

== See also ==
- Equation of time
- Sundial
- Clock
- Differential (mechanical device)
- Japanese clock
