= Sun-synchronous orbit =

Type of geocentric orbit

Diagram showing the orientation of a Sun-synchronous orbit (green) at four points in the year. A non-Sun-synchronous orbit (magenta) is also shown for reference. Dates are shown in white: day/month.

A Sun-synchronous orbit (SSO), also called a heliosynchronous orbit, is a nearly polar orbit around a planet, in which the satellite passes over any given point of the planet's surface at the same local mean solar time. More technically, it is an orbit arranged so that, for each revolution of the planet around the Sun, its orbital plane (specifically the longitude of the ascending node) precesses through one complete revolution around the planet.

== Applications ==
A Sun-synchronous orbit is useful for imaging, reconnaissance, and weather satellites, because every time that the satellite is overhead, the surface illumination angle on the planet underneath it is nearly the same. This consistent lighting is a useful characteristic for satellites that image the Earth's surface in visible or infrared wavelengths, such as weather and spy satellites, and for other remote-sensing satellites, such as those carrying ocean and atmospheric remote-sensing instruments that require sunlight. For example, a satellite in Sun-synchronous orbit might ascend across the equator twelve times a day, each time at approximately 15:00 mean local time.

Sun-synchronous orbit from a top view of the ecliptic plane with local solar time (LST) zones for reference and a descending node of 10:30. The LST zones show how the local time beneath the satellite varies at different latitudes and different points on its orbit.

Special cases of the Sun-synchronous orbit are the noon/midnight orbit, where the local mean solar time of passage for equatorial latitudes is around noon or midnight, and the dawn/dusk orbit, where the local mean solar time of passage for equatorial latitudes is around sunrise or sunset, so that the satellite rides the terminator between day and night. Riding the terminator is useful for active radar satellites, as the satellites' solar panels can always see the Sun, without being shadowed by the Earth. It is also useful for some satellites with passive instruments that need to limit the Sun's influence on the measurements, as it is possible to always point the instruments towards the night side of the Earth. The dawn/dusk orbit has been used for solar-observing scientific satellites such as TRACE, Hinode and PROBA-2, affording them a nearly continuous view of the Sun.

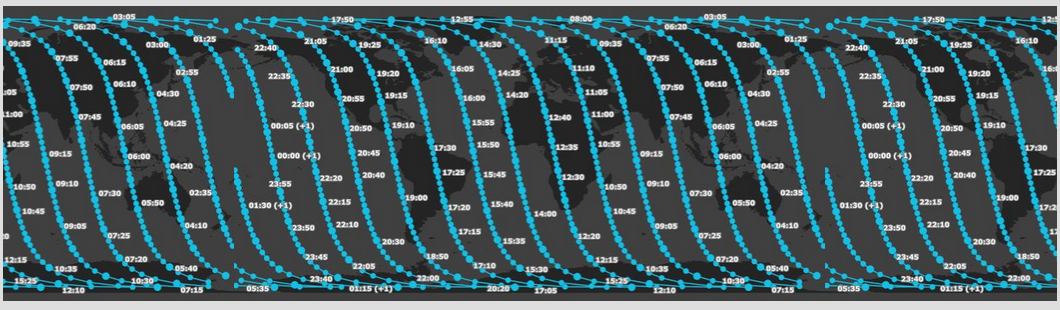
As of 2021 Aqua's ascending orbital path crosses equator at 13:30 local time

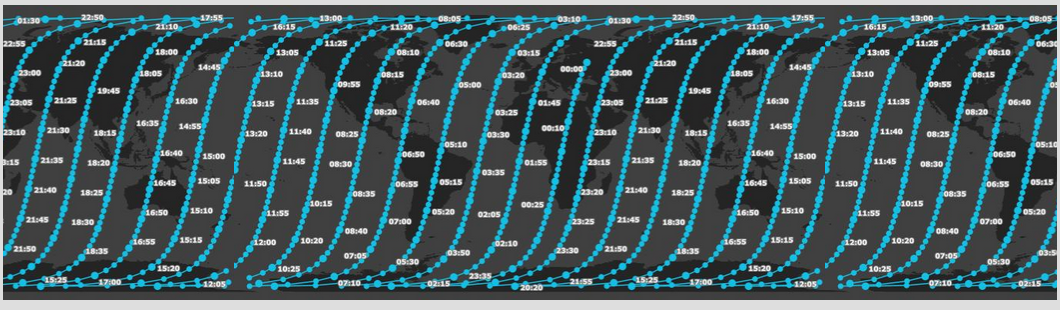
As of 2021 Aqua's descending orbital path crosses equator at 01:30 local time

== Orbital precession ==
A Sun-synchronous orbit is achieved by having the osculating orbital plane precess (rotate) approximately one degree eastward each day with respect to the celestial sphere to keep pace with the Earth's movement around the Sun. This precession is achieved by tuning the inclination to the altitude of the orbit (see Technical details) such that Earth's equatorial bulge, which perturbs inclined orbits, causes the orbital plane of the spacecraft to precess with the desired rate. The plane of the orbit is not fixed in space relative to the distant stars, but rotates slowly about the Earth's axis.

Typical Sun-synchronous orbits around Earth are about 600–800 km (370–500 mi) in altitude, with periods in the 96–100-minute range, and inclinations of around 98°. This is slightly retrograde compared to the direction of Earth's rotation: 0° represents an equatorial orbit, and 90° represents a polar orbit.

Sun-synchronous orbits are possible around other oblate planets, such as Mars. A satellite orbiting a planet such as Venus that is almost spherical will need an additional perturbation to maintain a Sun-synchronous orbit.

== Technical details ==
The angular precession per orbit for an Earth orbiting satellite is approximately given by
$$\Delta \Omega = -3\pi \frac{J_2 R_\text{E}^2}{p^2} \cos i,$$
where

- J_{2} = 1.08263×10^{−3} is the coefficient for the second zonal term related to the oblateness of the Earth;
- R_{E} ≈ 6378 km is the mean radius of the Earth;
- p is the semi-latus rectum of the orbit (in km); and
- i is the inclination of the orbit to the equator.

An orbit will be Sun-synchronous when the precession rate ρ = dΩ/dt equals the mean motion of the Earth about the Sun n_{E}, which is 360° per sidereal year (1.99096871×10^{−7} rad/s), so we must set n_{E} = ΔΩ_{E}/T_{E} = ρ = ΔΩ/T , where T_{E} is the Earth orbital period, while T is the period of the spacecraft around the Earth.

As the orbital period of a spacecraft is
$$T = 2\pi \sqrt{\frac{a^3}{\mu}},$$

where a is the semi-major axis of the orbit, and μ is the standard gravitational parameter of the planet (398600.440 km^{3}/s^{2} for Earth); as p ≈ a for a circular or almost circular orbit, it follows that
$$\begin{align}
\rho &\approx -\frac{3J_2 R_\text{E}^2 \sqrt{\mu}\cos i}{2a^{7/2}} \\
&= -(360^\circ\text{ per year}) \times \left(\frac{a}{12\,352\text{ km}}\right)^{-7/2} \cos i \\
&= -(360^\circ\text{ per year}) \times \left(\frac{T}{3.795\text{ h}}\right)^{-7/3} \cos i,
\end{align}$$

or when ρ is 360° per year,
$$\cos i \approx -\frac{2\rho}{3 J_2 R_\text{E}^2 \sqrt{\mu}} a^{7/2} =
-\left(\frac{a}{12\,352\text{ km}}\right)^{7/2} =
-\left(\frac{T}{3.795\text{ h}}\right)^{7/3}.$$

As an example, with a = 7200 km, i.e., for an altitude a − R_{E} ≈ 800 km of the spacecraft over Earth's surface, this formula gives a Sun-synchronous inclination of 98.7°.

Note that according to this approximation cos i equals −1 when the semi-major axis equals 12352 km, which means that only lower orbits can be Sun-synchronous. The period can be in the range from 88 minutes for a very low orbit (a = 6554 km, i = 96°) to 3.8 hours (a = 12352 km, but this orbit would be equatorial, with i = 180°). A period longer than 3.8 hours may be possible by using an eccentric orbit with p < 12352 km but a > 12352 km.

Valid orbital frequencies for a sun-sychronous orbit
Orbits per day	Period (h)		Altitude (km)	Maximal latitude	Incl.
16	1 1/2	= 1:30	274	83.4°	96.6°
15	1 3/5	= 1:36	567	82.3°	97.7°
14	1 5/7	≈ 1:43	894	81.0°	99.0°
13	1 11/13	≈ 1:51	1262	79.3°	100.7°
12	2		1681	77.0°	103.0°
11	2 2/11	≈ 2:11	2162	74.0°	106.0°
10	2 2/5	= 2:24	2722	69.9°	110.1°
9	2 2/3	= 2:40	3385	64.0°	116.0°
8	3		4182	54.7°	125.3°
7	3 3/7	≈ 3:26	5165	37.9°	142.1°

If a satellite is to fly over some given spot on Earth every day at the same hour, the satellite must complete a whole number of orbits per day. Assuming a circular orbit, this comes down to between 7 and 16 orbits per day, as doing less than 7 orbits would require an altitude above the maximum for a Sun-synchronous orbit, and doing more than 16 would require an orbit inside the Earth's atmosphere or surface. The resulting valid orbits are shown in the table. (The table was initially calculated using the given orbital periods. However, for a sun-synchronous orbit, the period that should be used is slightly longer than the nominal (nodal) period. A sun-synchronous orbit that crosses the equator in one direction in $T_\text{nodal}$ minutes has a true period of approximately $T_{\rm true} \approx T_{\rm nodal} \left( 1 + 2.74003 \times 10^{-6} \, T_{\rm nodal} \right)$. Note also that precise values of semi-major axis will differ slightly from those shown in the table due to the short-period variations in orbital elements resulting from Earth's oblateness affecting the period of a whole orbit.)

When one says that a Sun-synchronous orbit goes over a spot on the Earth at the same local time each time, this refers to mean solar time, not to apparent solar time. The Sun will not be in exactly the same position in the sky during the course of the year (see Equation of time and Analemma).

=== Frozen ===
Sun-synchronous orbits are mostly selected for Earth observation satellites, with an altitude typically between 600 and 1000 km over the Earth surface. Even if an orbit remains Sun-synchronous, however, other orbital parameters such as argument of periapsis and the orbital eccentricity evolve, due to higher-order perturbations in the Earth's gravitational field, the pressure of sunlight, and other causes. Earth observation satellites, in particular, prefer orbits with constant altitude when passing over the same spot. Careful selection of eccentricity and location of perigee reveals specific combinations where the rate of change of perturbations are minimized, and hence the orbit is relatively stable – a frozen orbit, where the motion of position of the periapsis is stable. (It can be alternatively said that the rotation of the apse line is minimized.)

The ERS-1, ERS-2 and Envisat of European Space Agency, as well as the MetOp spacecraft of EUMETSAT and RADARSAT-2 of the Canadian Space Agency, are all operated in such Sun-synchronous frozen orbits (around 790 km).

Sun-synchronous frozen orbits have also been used around other Solar System bodies, including asteroids. It is possible to design a Sun-synchronous orbit that also naturally tracks the Sun (orients the solar panels towards the Sun).

There is also a concept of "artificial frozen orbits", orbits that take a low amount of continuous thrust to maintain. These allow some effects of a frozen SSO to be gained around a planetary body that does not allow SSOs by its own gravitational parameters.

Other synchronous orbits can also be made frozen. For example, there is a design for a Ganymede-synchronous frozen orbit around Europa.

== Earth orbit allocation ==
The SSO is a limited resource. A "slot" system has been proposed to standardize the orbits in order to minimize the risks of conjunction.

== See also ==
- Orbital perturbation analysis (spacecraft)
- Analemma
- Dyson ring
- Geosynchronous orbit
- Geostationary orbit
- List of orbits
- Polar orbit
- Space-based data center
- World Geodetic System
