= Analemma =

Diagrammatic representation of Sun's position over a period of time

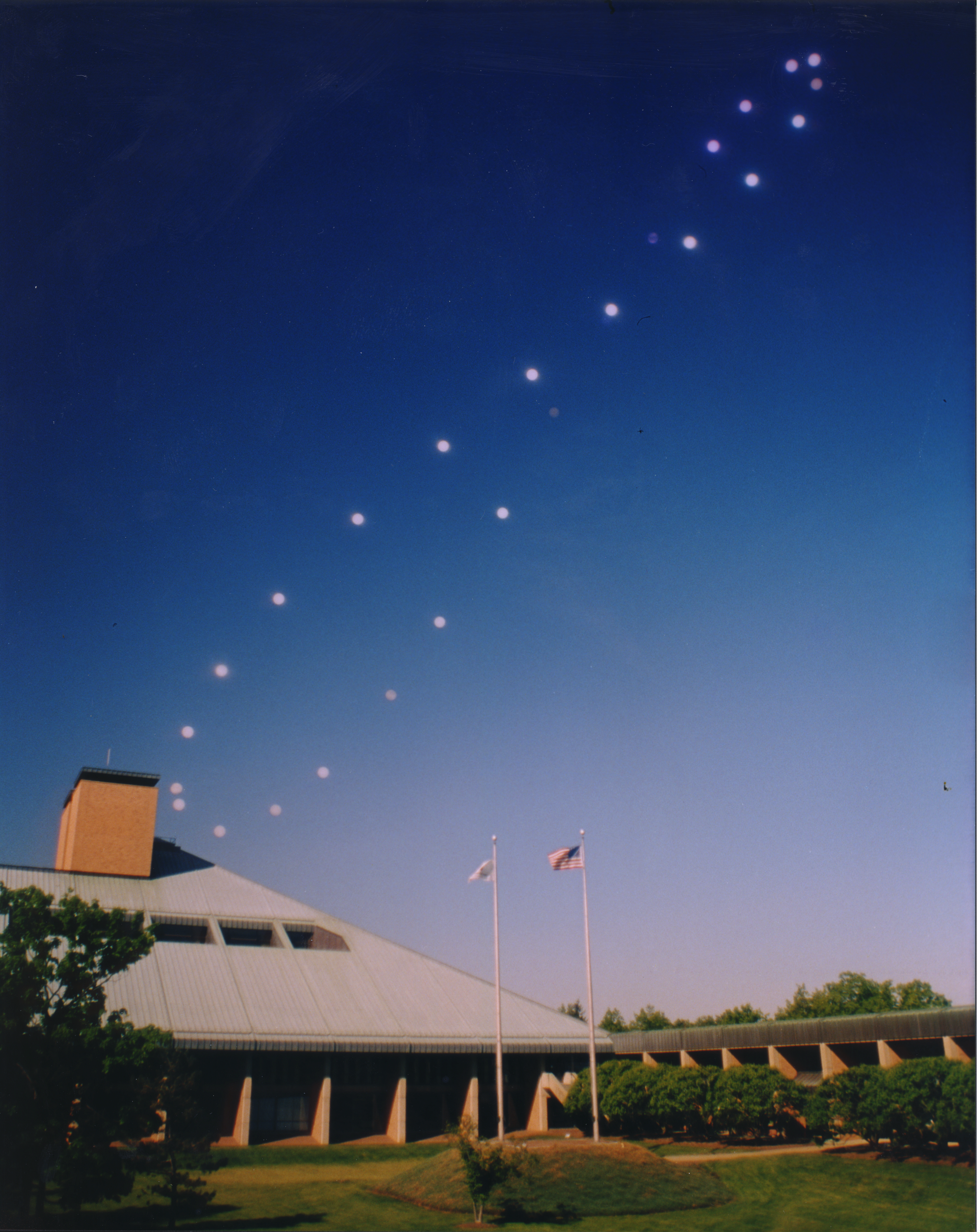
Afternoon analemma photo taken in 1998–99 in Murray Hill, New Jersey, U.S., by Jack Fishburn. The Bell Laboratories building is in the foreground.

In astronomy, an analemma (/ˌænəˈlɛmə/; from Ancient Greek ἀνάλημμα (analēmma) 'support') (Note: The word is now rare in English.The Oxford English Dictionary does not give a plural form, but the Greek plural would be analemmata. In English analemmas is more commonly used.) is a diagram showing the position of the Sun in the sky as seen from a fixed location on Earth at the same mean solar time over the course of a year. The change of position is a result of the shifting of the angle in the sky of the path that the Sun takes in respect to the stars (the ecliptic). The diagram resembles a figure eight. Globes of the Earth often display an analemma as a two-dimensional figure of equation of time ("sun fast") vs. declination of the Sun.

The north–south component of the analemma results from the change in the Sun's declination due to the tilt of Earth's axis of rotation as it orbits around the Sun. The east–west component results from the nonuniform rate of change of the Sun's right ascension, governed by the combined effects of Earth's axial tilt and its orbital eccentricity.

An analemma can be photographed by keeping a camera at a fixed location and orientation and taking multiple exposures throughout the year, always at the same time of day (disregarding daylight saving time and in as little cloud cover as possible).

Although the term analemma usually refers to Earth's solar analemma, it can be applied to other celestial bodies as well.

== Description ==
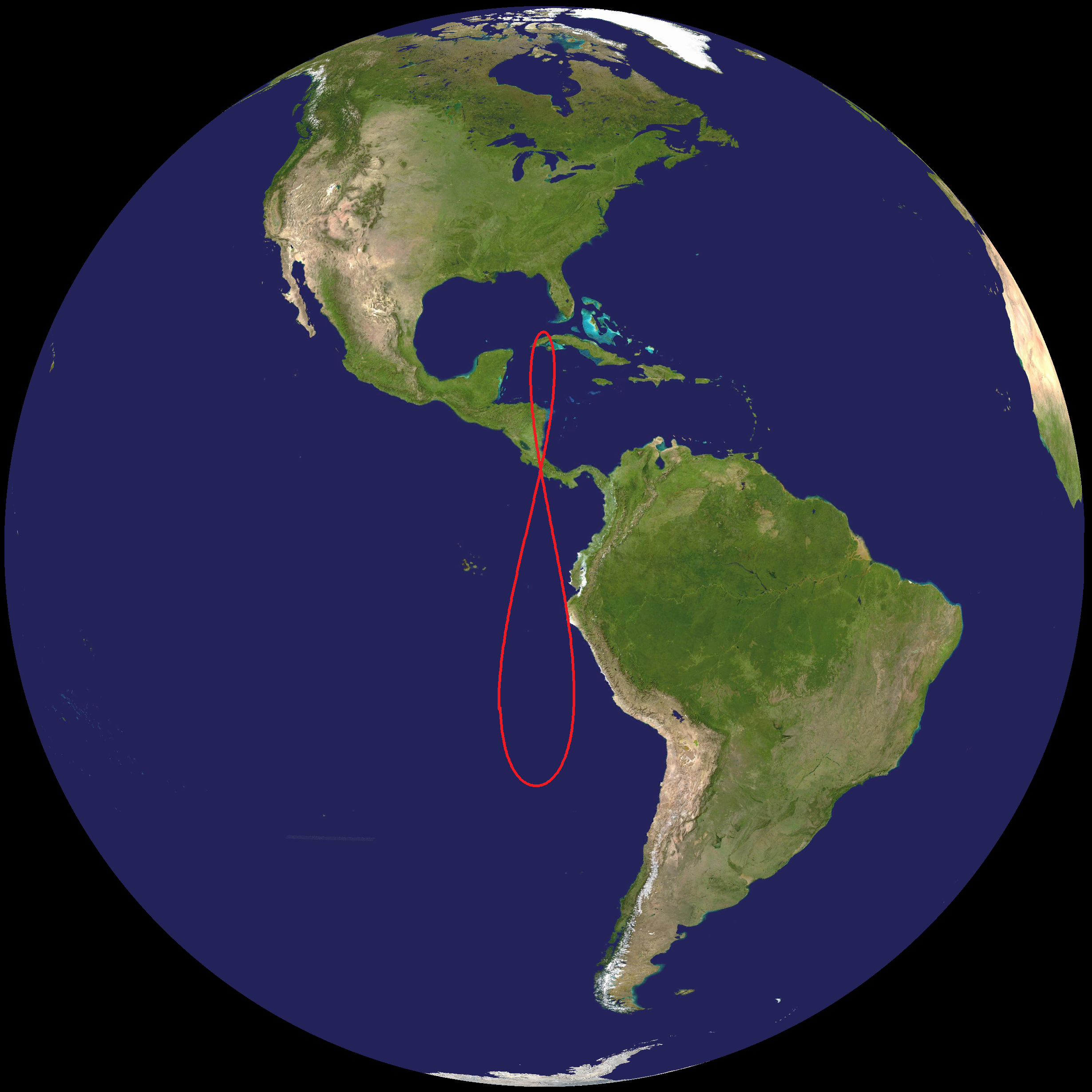
Analemma on Earth. The red line shows the position on Earth where the Sun is directly overhead, taken at 24 hours intervals over the course of one year.

An analemma can be traced by plotting the position of the Sun as viewed from a fixed position on Earth at the same clock time every day for an entire year, or by plotting a graph of the Sun's declination against the equation of time. The resulting curve resembles a long, slender figure-eight with one lobe much larger than the other. This curve is commonly printed on terrestrial globes, usually in the eastern Pacific Ocean, the only large tropical region with very little land. It is possible, though challenging, to photograph the analemma, by leaving the camera in a fixed position for an entire year and snapping images on 24-hour intervals (or some multiple thereof); see section below.

The long axis of the figure—the line segment joining the northernmost point on the analemma to the southernmost—is bisected by the celestial equator, to which it is approximately perpendicular, and has a "length" of twice the obliquity of the ecliptic, i.e., about 47°. The component along this axis of the Sun's apparent motion is a result of the familiar seasonal variation of the declination of the Sun through the year. The "width" of the figure is due to the equation of time, and its angular extent is the difference between the greatest positive and negative deviations of local solar time from local mean time when this time-difference is related to angle at the rate of 15° per hour, i.e., 360° in 24 h. This width of the analemma is approximately 7.7°, so the length of the figure is more than six times its width. The difference in size of the lobes of the figure-eight form arises mainly from the fact that the perihelion and aphelion occur far from the equinoxes. Instead, they occur a couple of weeks after the solstices, which in turn causes a slight tilt of the figure eight and its minor lateral asymmetry.

Three parameters affect the size and shape of the analemma: obliquity, eccentricity, and the angle between the northward equinox and the periapsis. Viewed from an object with a perfectly circular orbit and no axial tilt, the Sun would always appear at the same point in the sky at the same time of day throughout the year and the analemma would be a dot. For an object with a circular orbit but significant axial tilt, the analemma would be a figure of eight with northern and southern lobes equal in size. For an object with an eccentric orbit but no axial tilt, the analemma would be a straight east–west line along the celestial equator.

The north–south component of the analemma shows the Sun's declination, its latitude on the celestial sphere, or the latitude on the Earth at which the Sun is directly overhead. The east–west component shows the equation of time, or the difference between solar time and local mean time. This can be interpreted as how much "ahead" or "behind" the Sun (or an analemmatic sundial) is compared to clock time. It also shows how far west or east the Sun is, compared with its mean position. The analemma can be considered as a graph in which the Sun's declination and the equation of time are plotted against each other. In many diagrams of the analemma, a third dimension, that of time, is also included, shown by marks that represent the position of the Sun at various, fairly closely spaced, dates throughout the year.

In diagrams, the analemma is drawn as it would be seen in the sky by an observer looking upward. If north is at the top, west is to the right. This corresponds with the sign of the equation of time, which is positive in the westward direction. The further west the Sun is, compared with its mean position, the more "fast" a sundial is, compared with a clock. If the analemma is a graph with positive declination (north) plotted upward, positive equation of time (west) is plotted to the right. This is the conventional orientation for graphs. When the analemma is marked on a geographical globe, west in the analemma is to the right, while the geographical features on the globe are shown with west to the left. To avoid this confusion, it has been suggested that analemmas on globes should be printed with west to the left, but this is not done, at least, not frequently. In practice, the analemma is so nearly symmetrical that the shapes of the mirror images are not easily distinguished, but if date markings are present, they go in opposite directions. The Sun moves eastward on the analemma near the solstices. This can be used to tell which way the analemma is printed. See the image above, at high magnification.

An analemma that includes an image of a solar eclipse, which required meticulous planning and cooperation, has been called a tutulemma, a term coined by photographers Cenk E. Tezel and Tunç Tezel based on the Turkish word for eclipse.

== History ==
The book "Analemma" (Greek: Περὶ ἀναλήμματος) by Ptolemy deals with the means for plotting the celestial coordinates of the Sun or any other heavenly body for any geographical latitude at any time. The construction of sundials depends on such calculations.

From this, analemma came to mean the graphical procedure of representing three-dimensional objects in two dimensions. In 1613, François d'Aguilon of Antwerp, began promoting orthographic projection as the name for this process. Today orthographic projection is what it is universally called.

In 1644, mathematician Jean-Louis Vaulezard described the first analemmatic sundial installed in France (and probably in the world). The sundial is located at the church of Brou, and depicts the 8-shape analemma. Analemmas (in the modern sense of the term) have been used in conjunction with sundials since the 18th century to convert between apparent and mean solar time.

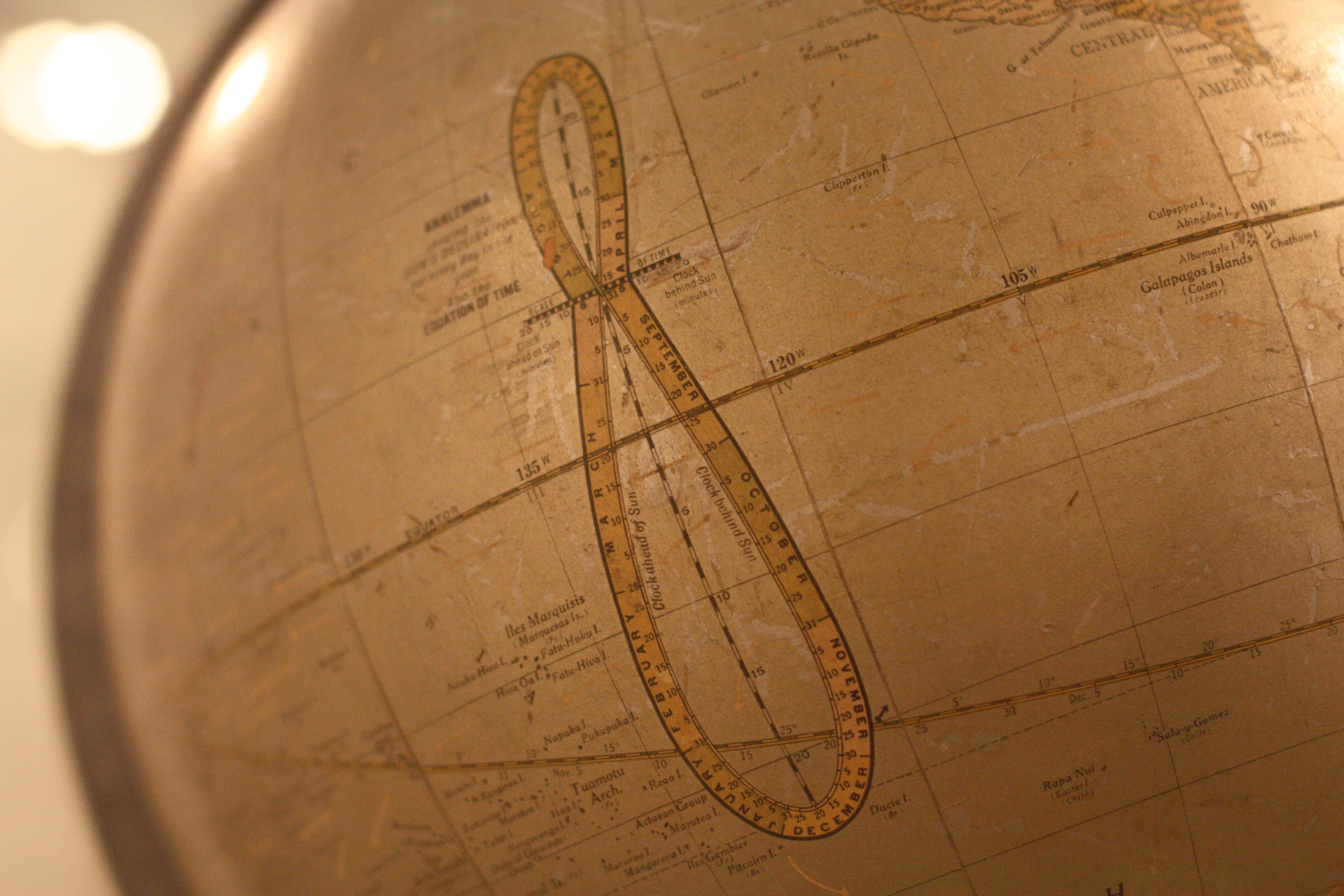
Analemma with date marks, printed on a globe, Globe Museum, Vienna, Austria

Analemmas were often depicted on early globes. One such example is the terrestrial globe by George Woodward, made in 1846. In 1812, John Lathrop wrote:

What is called the analemma, on the globe, is a narrow slip of paper, the length of which is equal to the breadth of the torrid zone. It is pasted on some vacant place on the globe, in the torrid zone, and is divided into months and days of months, correspondent to the sun's declination for every day in the year.

== As seen from Earth ==
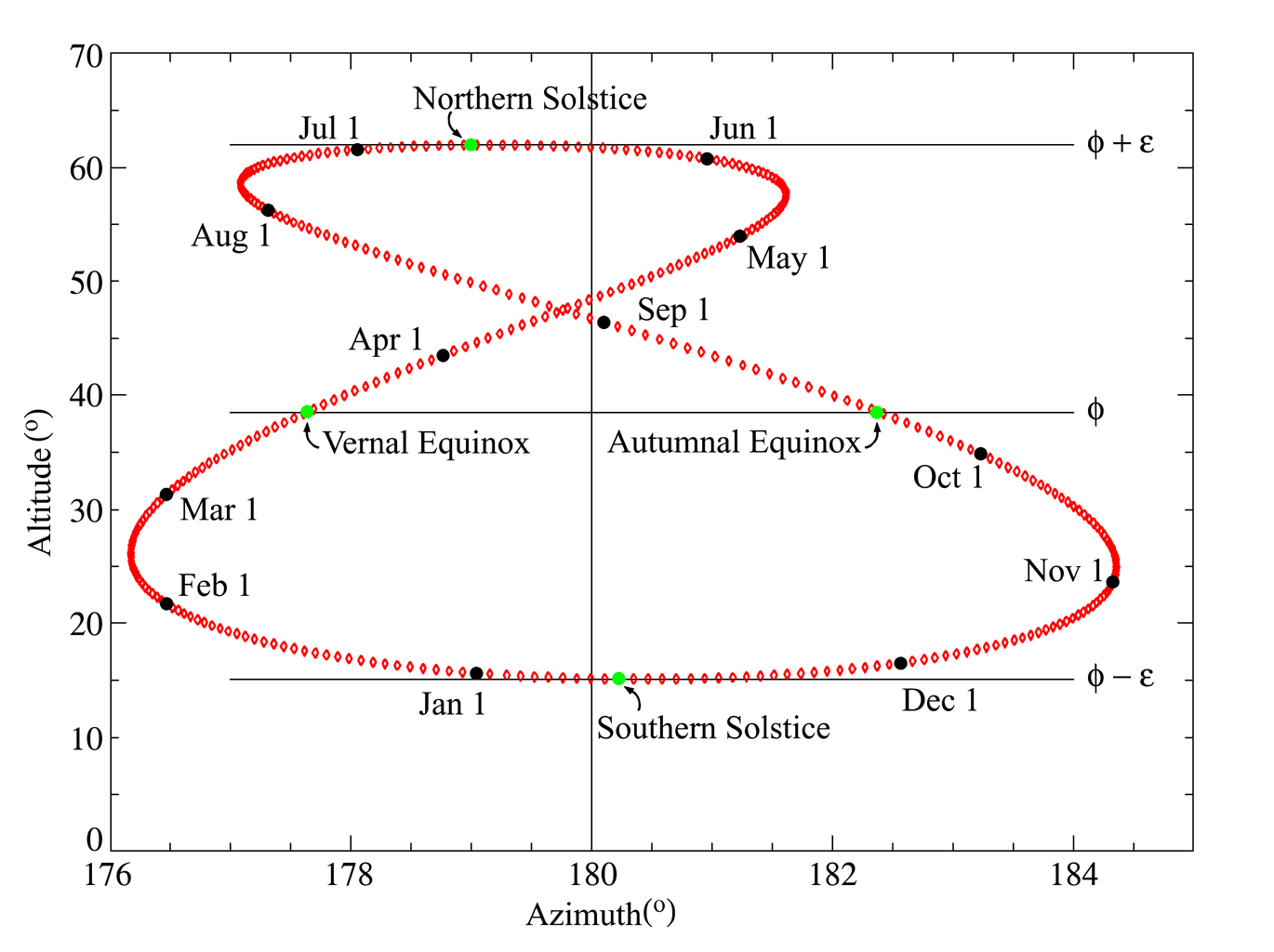
Analemma plotted as seen at noon GMT from the Royal Observatory, Greenwich (latitude 51.48° north, longitude 0.0015° west)

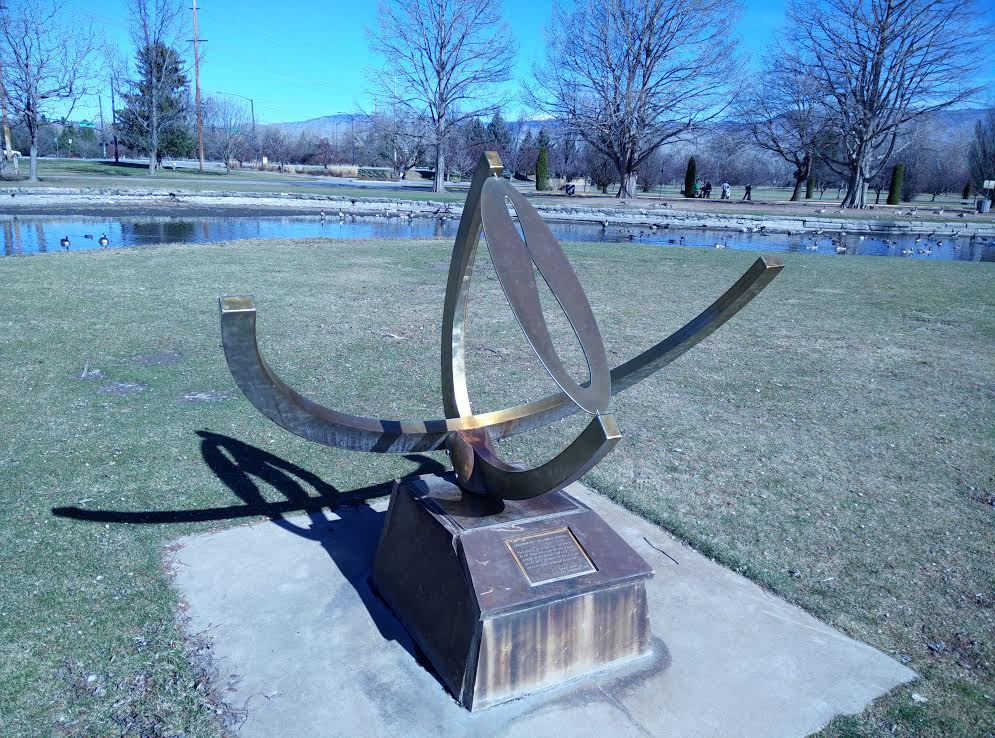
The analemma cutout of this sundial causes the edge of the shadow to fall on the true time.

Owing to the tilt of Earth's axis (23.439°) and the Earth's orbital eccentricity, the relative location of the Sun above the horizon is not constant from day to day when observed at the same clock time each day. If the time of observation is not 12:00 noon local mean time, then depending on one's geographical latitude, this loop will be inclined at different angles.

The figure in this section is an example of an analemma as seen from the Earth's Northern Hemisphere. It is a plot of the position of the Sun at 12:00 noon at Royal Observatory, Greenwich, England (latitude 51.48°N, longitude 0.0015°W) during the year 2006. The horizontal axis is the azimuth angle in degrees (180° is facing south). The vertical axis is the altitude in degrees above the horizon. The first day of each month is shown in black, and the solstices and equinoxes are shown in green. It can be seen that the equinoxes occur approximately at altitude φ = 90° − 51.5° = 38.5°, and the solstices occur approximately at altitudes φ ± ε where ε is the axial tilt of the Earth, 23.4°. The analemma is plotted with its width highly exaggerated, revealing a slight asymmetry (due to the two-week misalignment between the apsides of the Earth's orbit and its solstices).

The analemma is oriented with the smaller loop appearing north of the larger loop. At the North Pole, the analemma would be completely upright (an 8 with the small loop at the top), and only the top half of it would be visible. Heading south, once south of the Arctic Circle, the entire analemma would become visible. If seen at noon, it continues to be upright, and rises higher from the horizon as the viewer moves south. At the equator it is directly overhead. Further south it moves toward the northern horizon, and is then seen with the larger loop at the top. If viewed at the analemma in the early morning or evening, it would start to tilt to one side as the viewer moves southward from the North Pole. At the equator the analemma would be completely horizontal. As the viewer continued south it would rotate so that the small loop was beneath the large loop in the sky. Crossing the Antarctic Circle the analemma, now nearly completely inverted, would start to disappear, until only 50%, part of the larger loop, was visible from the South Pole.

See equation of time for a more detailed description of the east–west characteristics of the analemma.

== Photography ==
The first successful analemma photograph ever made was created in 1978–79 by photographer Dennis di Cicco over Watertown, Massachusetts. Without moving his camera, he made 44 exposures on a single frame of film, all taken at the same time of day at least a week apart. A foreground image and three long-exposure images were also included in the same frame, bringing the total number of exposures to 48.

== Calculated analemmas ==
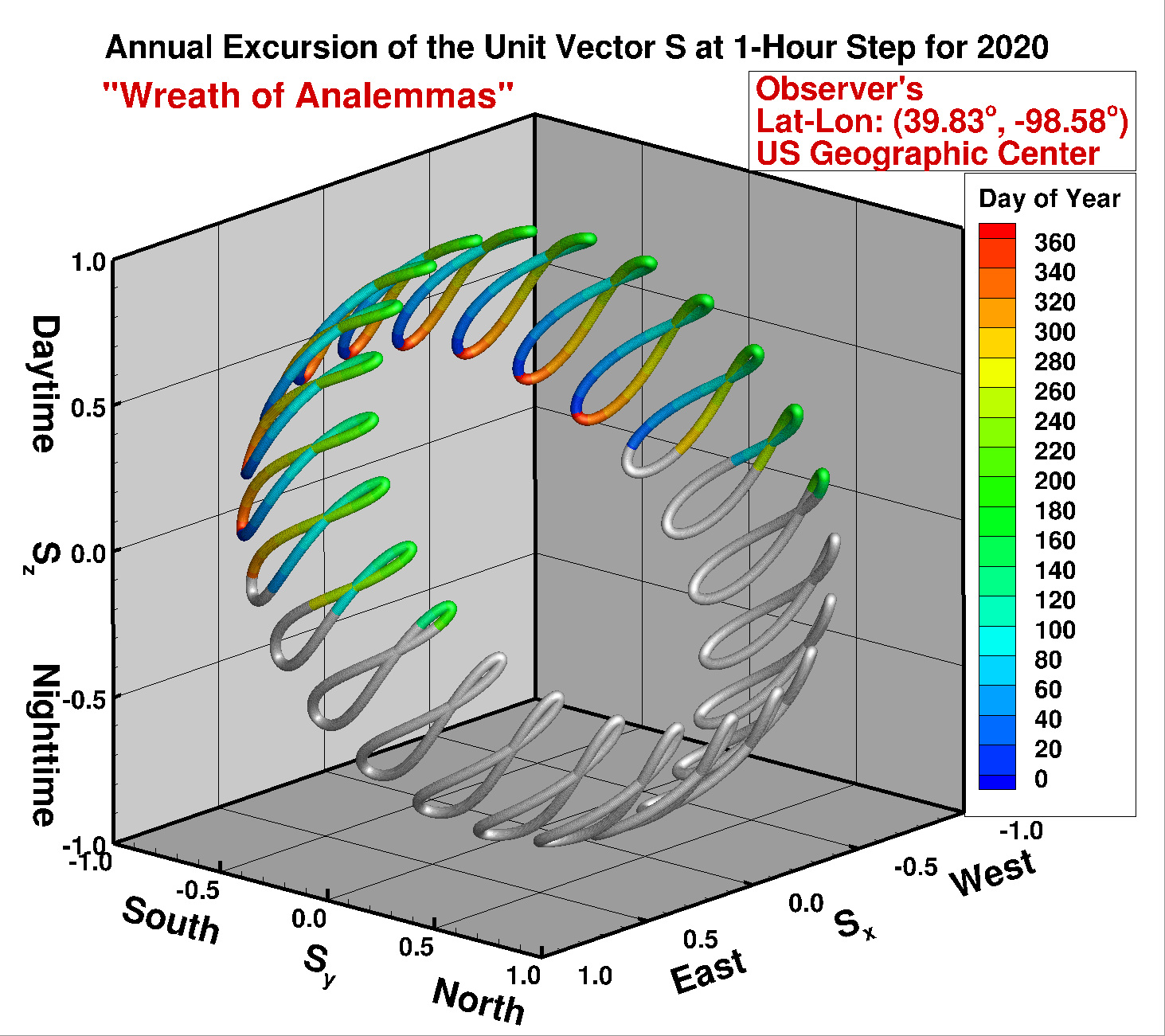
"Wreath of Analemmas". Analemmas calculated at 1-hour apart from each other for the geographic center of the contiguous United States. The gray part indicates it is nighttime.

While photographing analemmas may present technical and practical challenges, they can be calculated conveniently and presented in 3D plots for any given location on the surface of the Earth.

The idea is based on the unit vector with its origin fixed at a chosen point on the surface of the Earth and its direction pointing to the center of the Sun all the time. If the position of the Sun is calculated, the solar zenith angle and solar azimuth angle at one-hour steps for an entire year, the head of the unit vector traces out 24 analemmas on the unit sphere centered on the chosen point. This unit sphere is equivalent to the celestial sphere. The figure on the right is the "wreath of analemmas" calculated for the geographic center of the contiguous United States.

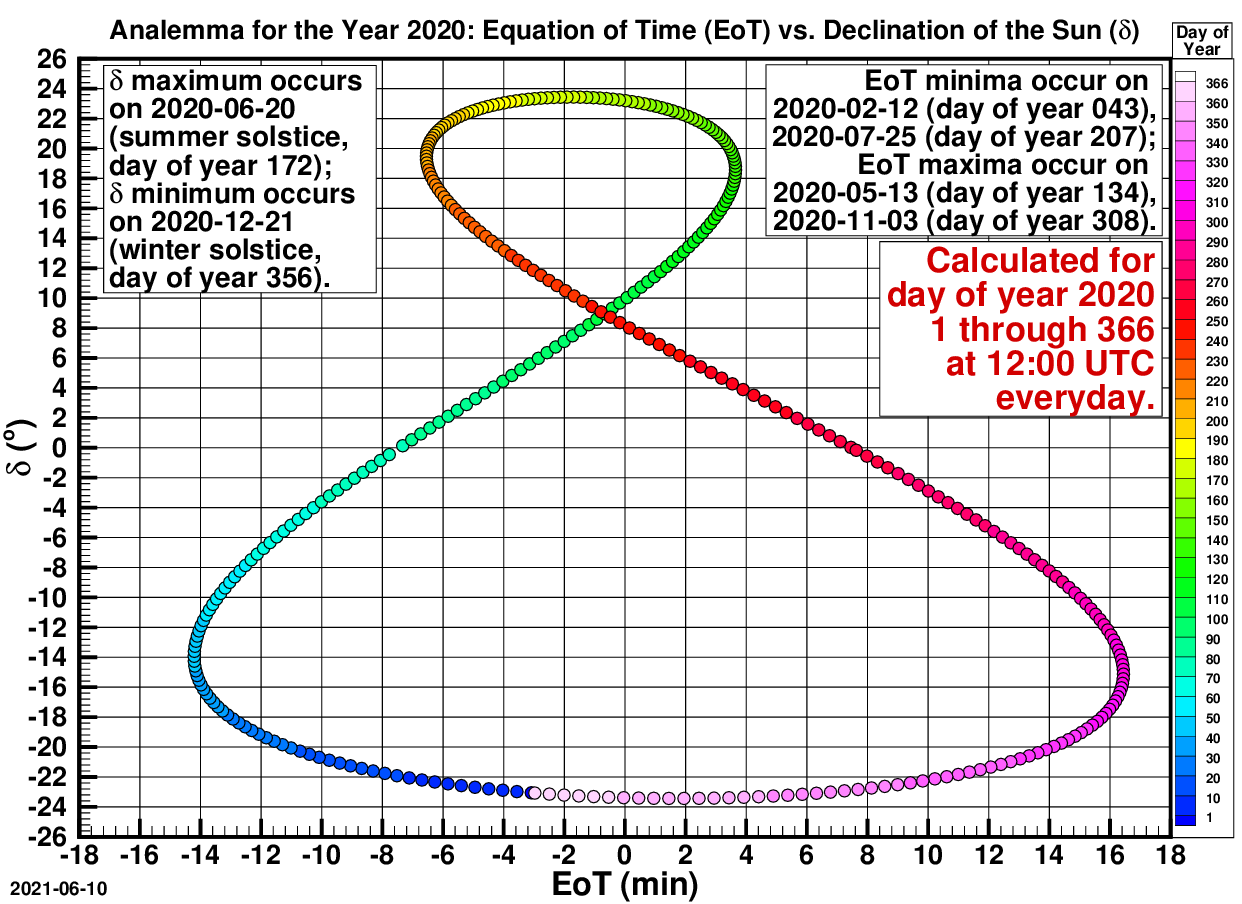
Analemma: Equation of time vs. declination of the Sun. Calculated for the year 2020 using the formulas from The Astronomical Almanac for the Year 2019.

As often seen on a globe, the analemma is also often plotted as a two-dimensional figure of equation of time vs. declination of the Sun. The adjacent figure ("Analemma: Equation of time...") is calculated using the algorithm presented in the reference that uses the formulas given in The Astronomical Almanac for the Year 2019.

== Estimating sunrise and sunset data ==
If marked to show the position of the Sun on it at fairly regular intervals (such as the 1st, 11th, and 21st days of every calendar month) the analemma summarises the apparent motion of the Sun, relative to its mean position, throughout the year. A date-marked diagram of the analemma, with equal scales in both north–south and east–west directions, can be used as a tool to estimate quantities such as the times of sunrise and sunset, which depend on the Sun's position. Generally, making these estimates depends on visualizing the analemma as a rigid structure in the sky, which moves around the Earth at constant speed so it rises and sets once a day, with the Sun slowly moving around it once a year.

Some approximations are involved in the process, chiefly the use of a plane diagram to represent positions on the celestial sphere, and the use of drawing and measurement instead of numerical calculation. Because of these, the estimates are not perfectly precise, but they are usually good enough for practical purposes. Also, they have instructional value, showing in a simple visual way how the times of sunrises and sunsets vary.

=== Earliest and latest sunrise and sunset ===
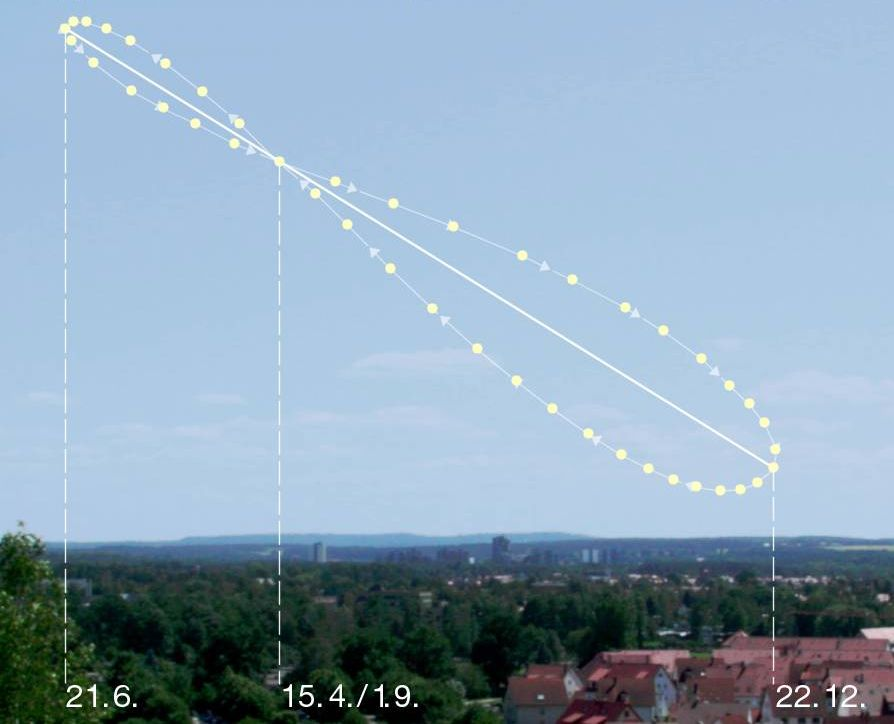
Diagram of an analemma looking east in the Northern Hemisphere. The dates of the Sun's position are shown. This analemma is calculated for 9am, not photographed.

The analemma can be used to find the dates of the earliest and latest sunrises and sunsets of the year. These do not occur on the dates of the solstices.

With reference to the image of a simulated analemma in the eastern sky, the lowest point of the analemma has just risen above the horizon. If the Sun were at that point, sunrise would have just occurred. This would be the latest sunrise of the year, since all other points on the analemma would rise earlier. Therefore, the date of the latest sunrise is when the Sun is at this lowest point (29 December, when the analemma is tilted as seen from latitude 50° north, as is shown in the diagram); however, in some areas that use daylight saving time, the date of the latest sunrise occurs on the day before daylight saving time ends. Similarly, when the Sun is at the highest point on the analemma, near its top-left end, (on 15 June) the earliest sunrise of the year will occur. Likewise, at sunset, the earliest sunset will occur when the Sun is at its lowest point on the analemma when it is close to the western horizon, and the latest sunset when it is at the highest point.

None of these points is exactly at one of the ends of the analemma, where the Sun is at a solstice. As seen from northern middle latitudes, as the diagram shows, the earliest sunset occurs some time before the December solstice – typically a week or two before it – and the latest sunrise happens a week or two after the solstice. Thus, the darkest evening occurs in early to mid-December, but the mornings keep getting darker until about the New Year.

Graph of time of sunrise for Libreville, Gabon, which is very near the equator. Note there are two maxima and two minima.

The exact dates are those on which the Sun is at the points where the horizon is tangential to the analemma, which in turn depend on how much the analemma, or the north–south meridian passing through it, is tilted from the vertical. This angle of tilt is essentially the co-latitude (90° minus the latitude) of the observer. Calculating these dates numerically is complex, but they can be estimated fairly accurately by placing a straight-edge, tilted at the appropriate angle, tangential to a diagram of the analemma, and reading the dates (interpolating as necessary) when the Sun is at the positions of contact.

In middle latitudes, the dates get further from the solstices as the absolute value of the latitude decreases. In near-equatorial latitudes, the situation is more complex. The analemma lies almost horizontal, so the horizon can be tangential to it at two points, one in each loop of the analemma. Thus there are two widely separated dates in the year when the Sun rises earlier than on adjoining dates, and so on.

=== Times of sunrise and sunset ===
A similar geometrical method, based on the analemma, can be used to find the times of sunrise and sunset at any place on Earth (except within or near the Arctic Circle or Antarctic Circle), on any date.

The origin of the analemma, where the solar declination and the equation of time are both zero, rises and sets at 6 a.m. and 6 p.m. local mean time on every day of the year, irrespective of the observer's latitude. (This estimation does not take account of atmospheric refraction.) If the analemma is drawn in a diagram, tilted at the appropriate angle for an observer's latitude (as described above), and if a horizontal line is drawn to pass through the position of the Sun on the analemma on any given date (interpolating between the date markings as necessary), then at sunrise this line represents the horizon.

The origin appears to move along the celestial equator at a speed of 15° per hour, the speed of the Earth's rotation. The distance along the celestial equator from the point where it intersects the horizon to the position of the origin of the analemma at sunrise is the distance the origin moves between 6 a.m. and the time of sunrise on the given date. Measuring the length of this equatorial segment therefore gives the difference between 6 a.m. and the time of sunrise.

The measurement should, of course, be done on the diagram, but it should be expressed in terms of the angle that would be subtended at an observer on the ground by the corresponding distance in the analemma in the sky. It can be useful to compare it with the length of the analemma, which subtends 47°. Thus, for example, if the length of the equatorial segment on the diagram is 0.4 times the length of the analemma on the diagram, then the segment in the celestial analemma would subtend 0.4 × 47° = 18.8° at the observer on the ground. The angle, in degrees, should be divided by 15 to get the time difference in hours between sunrise and 6 a.m. The sign of the difference is clear from the diagram. If the horizon line at sunrise passes above the origin of the analemma, the Sun rises before 6 a.m., and vice versa.

The same technique can be used, mutatis mutandis, to estimate the time of sunset. The estimated times are in local mean time. Corrections must be applied to convert them to standard time or daylight saving time. These corrections will include a term that involves the observer's longitude, so both the latitude and longitude affect the final result.

=== Azimuths of sunrise and sunset ===
The azimuths (true compass bearings) of the points on the horizon where the Sun rises and sets can be easily estimated, using the same diagram as is used to find the times of sunrise and sunset, as described above.

The point where the horizon intersects the celestial equator represents due east or west. The point where the Sun is at sunrise or sunset represents the direction of sunrise or sunset. Simply measuring the distance along the horizon between these points, in angular terms (comparing it with the length of the analemma, as described above), gives the angle between due east or west and the direction of sunrise or sunset. Whether the sunrise or sunset is north or south of due east or west is clear from the diagram. The larger loop of the analemma is at its southern end.

== Seen from other planets ==
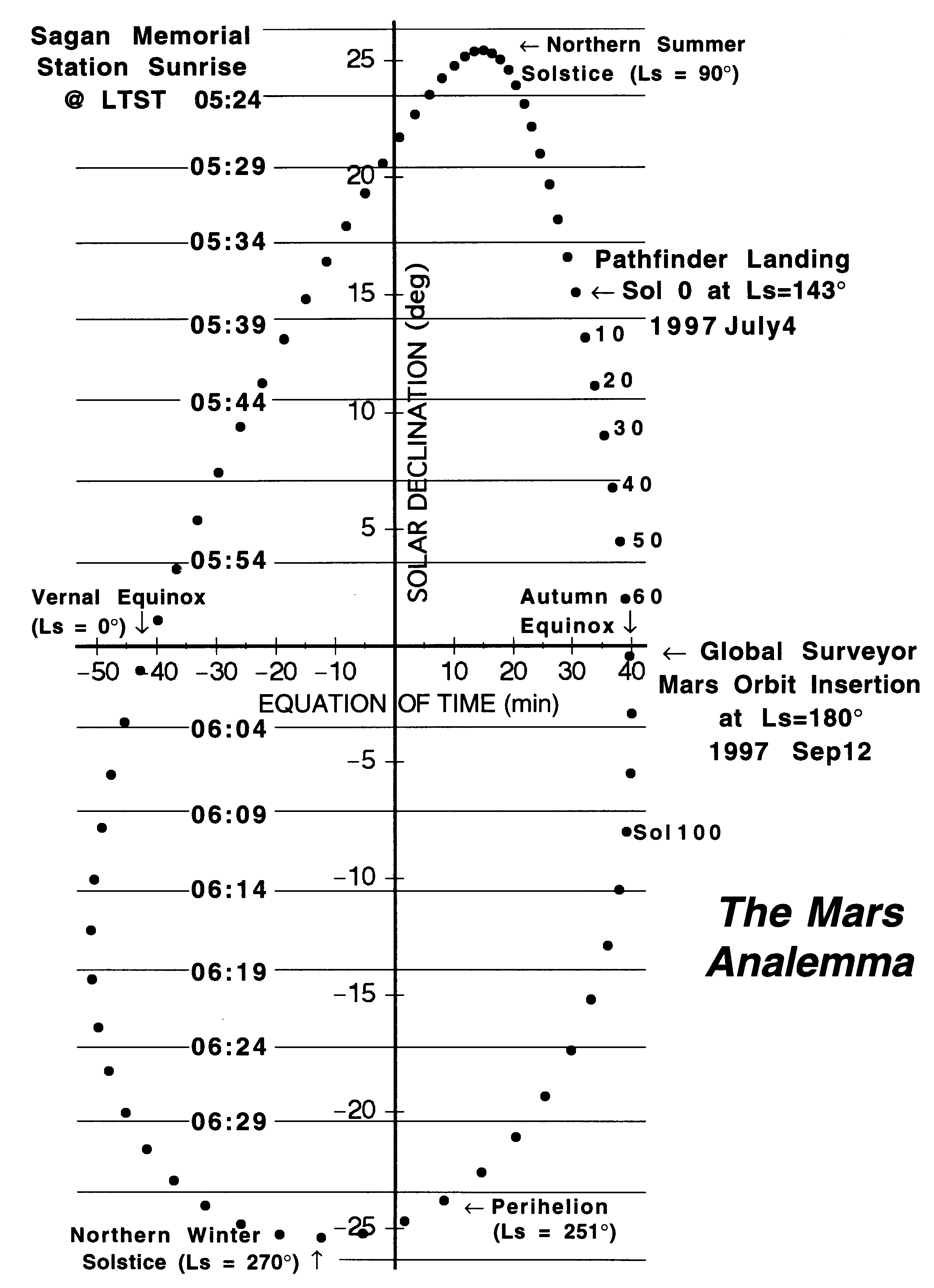
An analemma as viewed from Mars

On Earth, the analemma appears as a figure-eight, but on other Solar System bodies, it may be very different due to the interplay between the body's axial tilt, the non-circularity of its orbit (as characterized by its orbital eccentricity), and the angle between the northward equinox and the periapsis. The tilt tends to make the analemma into a figure-eight, since it causes the actual position of the Sun to run ahead of the mean solar time twice during the year (and therefore also to run behind solar time twice). The non-circularity of the orbit tends to make the analemma a figure-zero, with the position of the Sun running ahead of mean solar time once during the year due to Kepler's second law of planetary motion. In the case of Mars, the sum of the two effects gives a teardrop-shaped analemma. Jupiter, which has a tilt of only 3°, has an analemma that is approximately an ellipse.

A time-lapse of an analemma on Mars. Created using images of the MarsDial on the Opportunity rover.

In the following list, day and year refer to the synodic day and sidereal year of the particular body:

Mercury
Because orbital resonance makes the day exactly two years long, the method of plotting the Sun's position at the same time each day would yield only a single point. However, the equation of time can still be calculated for any time of the year, so an analemma can be graphed with this information. The resulting curve is a nearly straight east–west line.
Venus
There are slightly less than two days per year, so it would take several years to accumulate a complete analemma by the usual method. The resulting curve is an ellipse.
Mars
Teardrop.
Jupiter
Ellipse.
Saturn
Technically a figure-eight, but the northern loop is so small that it more closely resembles a teardrop.
Uranus
Figure-eight. (Uranus is tilted past sideways to an angle of 98°. Its orbit is about as eccentric as Jupiter's and more eccentric than Earth's.)
Neptune
Figure-eight.

== Of geosynchronous satellites ==
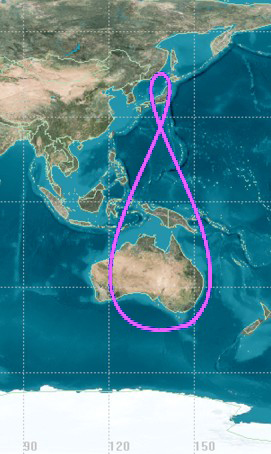
Groundtrack of QZSS geosynchronous orbit. Seen from the ground, its analemma would have a similar shape.

Geosynchronous satellites revolve around the Earth with a period of one sidereal day. Seen from a fixed point on the Earth's surface, they trace paths in the sky which repeat every day, and are therefore simple and meaningful analemmas. They are generally roughly elliptical, teardrop shaped, or figure-8 in shape. Their shapes and dimensions depend on the parameters of the orbits. A subset of geosynchronous satellites are geostationary ones, which ideally have perfectly circular orbits, exactly in the Earth's equatorial plane. A geostationary satellite therefore ideally remains stationary relative to the Earth's surface, staying over a single point on the equator. No real satellite is exactly geostationary, so real ones trace small analemmas in the sky. Since the sizes of the orbits of geosynchronous satellites are similar to the size of the Earth, substantial parallax occurs, depending on the location of the observer on the Earth's surface, so observers in different places see different analemmas.

The paraboloidal dishes that are used for radio communication with geosynchronous satellites often have to move so as to follow the satellite's daily movement around its analemma. The mechanisms that drive them must therefore be programmed with the parameters of the analemma. Exceptions are dishes that are used with (approximately) geostationary satellites, since these satellites appear to move so little that a fixed dish can function adequately at all times.

== Of quasi-satellites ==
Orbital diagram of a quasi-satellite

A quasi-satellite, such as the one shown in this diagram, moves in a prograde orbit around the Sun, with the same orbital period (which is also called a year) as the planet it accompanies, but with a different (usually greater) orbital eccentricity. It appears, when seen from the planet, to revolve around the planet once a year in the retrograde direction, but at varying speed and probably not in the ecliptic plane. Relative to its mean position, moving at constant speed in the ecliptic, the quasi-satellite traces an analemma in the planet's sky, going around it once a year.

== See also ==
- Anathem – 2008 science fiction novel by Neal Stephenson
- Armillary sphere – Model of objects in the sky consisting of a framework of rings
- De architectura – Treatise on architecture by Vitruvius
- Epicycle – Planetary motions in archaic models of the Solar System
- Lemniscate – Figure-eight-shaped curve
- On the Dioptra – Book on time by Hero of Alexandria
