= Synodic day =

Rotation period of a body relative to the primary object it orbits, e.g. solar day

A synodic day (or synodic rotation period or solar day) is the period for a celestial object to rotate once in relation to the star it is orbiting, and is the basis of solar time.

The synodic day is distinguished from the sidereal day, which is one complete rotation in relation to distant stars and is the basis of sidereal time.

In the case of a tidally locked planet, the same side always faces its parent star, and its synodic day is infinite. Its sidereal day, however, is equal to its orbital period.

== Earth ==
Earth's synodic day is the time it takes for the Sun to pass over the same meridian (a line of longitude) on consecutive days, whereas a sidereal day is the time it takes for a given distant star to pass over a meridian on consecutive days. For example, in the Northern Hemisphere, a synodic day could be measured as the time taken for the Sun to move from exactly true south (i.e. its highest declination) on one day to exactly south again on the next day (or exactly true north in the Southern Hemisphere).

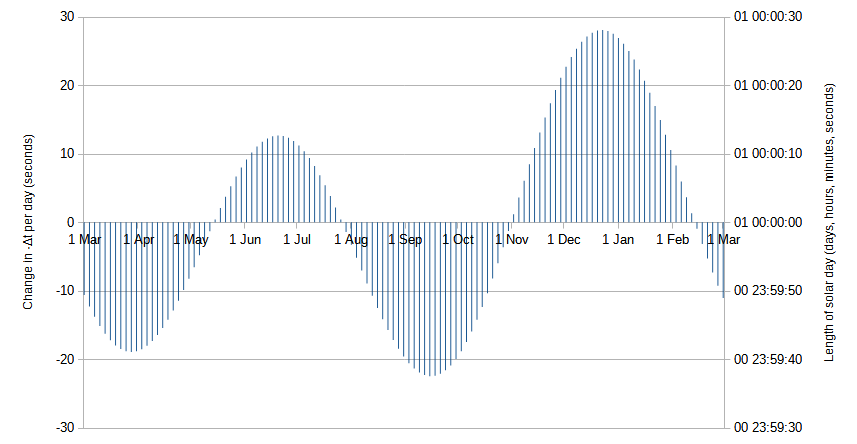
Derivative of −Δt. The axis on the right shows the length of the solar day.

For Earth, the synodic day is not constant, and changes over the course of the year due to the eccentricity of Earth's orbit around the Sun and the axial tilt of the Earth. The longest and shortest synodic days' durations differ by about 51 seconds. The mean length, however, is 24 hours (with fluctuations on the order of milliseconds), and is the basis of solar time. The difference between the mean and apparent solar time is the equation of time, which can also be seen in Earth's analemma. Because of the variation in the length of the synodic day, the days with the longest and shortest period of daylight do not coincide with the solstices near the equator.

As viewed from Earth during the year, the Sun appears to slowly drift along an imaginary path coplanar with Earth's orbit, known as the ecliptic, on a spherical background of seemingly fixed stars. Each synodic day, this gradual motion is a little less than 1° eastward (360° per 365.25 days), in a manner known as prograde motion.

Certain spacecraft orbits, Sun-synchronous orbits, have orbital periods that are a fraction of a synodic day. Combined with a nodal precession, this allows them to always pass over a location on Earth's surface at the same mean solar time.

== Moon ==
Due to tidal locking with Earth, the Moon's synodic day (the lunar day or synodic rotation period) is the same as its synodic period with Earth and the Sun (the period of the lunar phases, the synodic lunar month, which is the month of the lunar calendar).

== Venus ==
Due to the slow retrograde rotational speed of Venus, its synodic rotation period of 117 Earth days is about half the length of its sidereal rotational period (sidereal day) and even its orbital period.

== Mercury ==
Due to Mercury's slow rotational speed and fast orbit around the Sun, its synodic rotation period of 176 Earth days is three times longer than its sidereal rotational period (sidereal day) and twice as long as its orbital period.

== See also ==
- Day length fluctuations
- Noon § Solar noon
- Orbital period
- Rotation period
- Sidereal time
- Solar rotation
- Solar time
- Sun transit time
- Synodic month
