= Local mean time =

Time in astronomy

The equation of time — above the axis a sundial will appear fast relative to a clock showing local mean time, and below the axis a sundial will appear slow.

Local mean time (LMT) is a form of solar time that corrects the variations of local apparent time, forming a uniform time scale at a specific longitude. This measurement of time was used for everyday use during the 19th century before time zones were introduced beginning in the late 19th century; it still has some uses in astronomy and navigation.

The difference between local mean time and local apparent time is the equation of time.

== Past use ==
Local solar time or sundial time was used until the early 19th century when accurate mechanical clocks became commonplace. Local mean time continued in use until various countries adopted a national standard time. Each town or city kept its own meridian, so locations one degree of longitude apart had times four minutes apart. This became a problem in the mid 19th century when railways needed clocks for railway time that were synchronized between stations, while local people needed to match their clock (or the church clock) to the time tables. Standard time means that the same time is used throughout some regional time zone—usually, it is at an offset from Greenwich Mean Time or the local mean time of the capital of the region.

== See also ==
- Day
- Time zone
