= Solar time =

Calculation of elapsed time by the apparent position of the sun

On a prograde planet like the Earth, the sidereal day is shorter than the solar day. At time 1, the Sun and a certain distant star are both overhead. At time 2, the planet has rotated 360° and the distant star is overhead again (1→2 = one sidereal day). But it is not until a little later, at time 3, that the Sun is overhead again (1→3 = one solar day). More simply, 1→2 is a complete rotation of the Earth, but because the revolution around the Sun affects the angle at which the Sun is seen from the Earth, 1→3 is how long it takes noon to return. [Note that in this diagram, the relative motion, and corresponding angles, are highly exaggerated for illustrative purposes.]

Solar time is a calculation of the passage of time based on the position of the Sun in the sky. The fundamental unit of solar time is the day, based on the synodic rotation period. Traditionally, there are three types of time reckoning based on astronomical observations: apparent solar time and mean solar time (discussed in this article), and sidereal time, which is based on the apparent motions of stars other than the Sun.

== Introduction ==
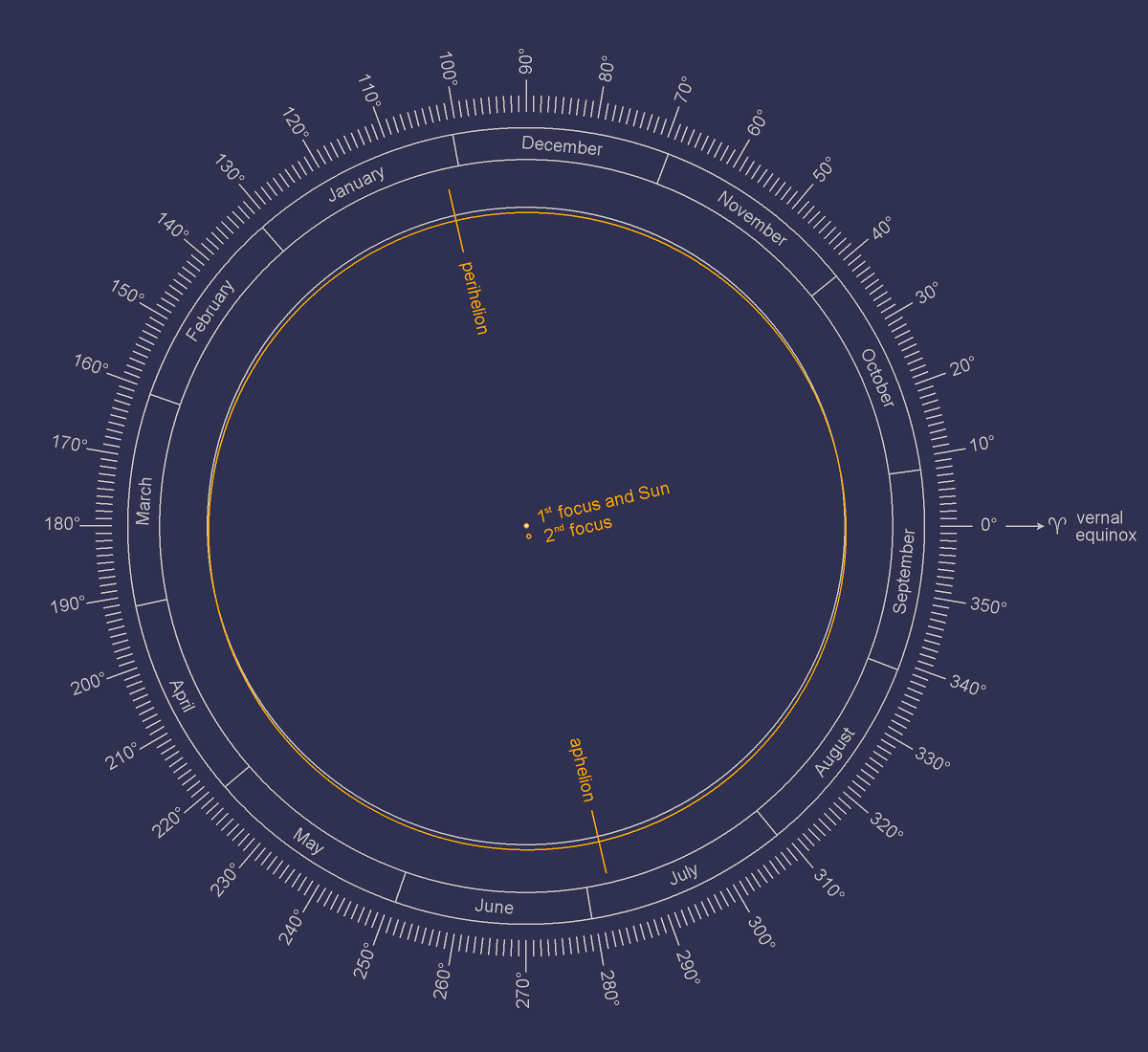
The Earth's orbit around the Sun, showing its eccentricity

A tall pole vertically fixed in the ground casts a shadow on any sunny day. At one moment during the day, the shadow will point exactly north or south (or disappear when and if the Sun moves directly overhead). That instant is called local apparent noon, or 12:00 local apparent time. About 24 hours later the shadow will again point north–south, the Sun seeming to have covered a 360-degree arc around Earth's axis. When the Sun has covered exactly 15 degrees (1/24 of a circle, both angles being measured in a plane perpendicular to Earth's axis), local apparent time is 13:00 exactly; after 15 more degrees it will be 14:00 exactly.

The problem is that in September the Sun takes less time (as measured by an accurate clock) to make an apparent revolution than it does in December; 24 "hours" of solar time can be 21 seconds less or 29 seconds more than 24 hours of clock time. This change is quantified by the equation of time, and is due to the eccentricity of Earth's orbit (as in, Earth's orbit is not perfectly circular, meaning that the Earth–Sun distance varies throughout the year), and the fact that Earth's axis is not perpendicular to the plane of its orbit (the so-called obliquity of the ecliptic).

The effect of this is that a clock running at a constant rate – e.g. completing the same number of pendulum swings in each hour – cannot follow the actual Sun; instead it follows an imaginary "mean Sun" that moves along the celestial equator at a constant rate that matches the real Sun's average rate over the year. This is "mean solar time", which is still not perfectly constant from one century to the next but is close enough for most purposes. As of 2008, a mean solar day is about 86,400.002 SI seconds, i.e., about 24.0000006 hours.

== Apparent solar time ==
The apparent sun is the true sun as seen by an observer on Earth. Apparent solar time or true solar time (Note: 'apparent' is commonly used in English-language sources, but 'true' is used in French astronomical literature and has become nearly as common in English sources. See: Vince, Samuel (1797). A Complete System Of Astronomy Vol 1. Cambridge University Press. p. 44. "What we call apparent time the French call true"; "Comprendre – Concepts fondamentaux – Echelles de temps". Bureau des Longitudes (in French). November 23, 2009. Archived from the original on November 23, 2009. "temps vrai [true time]"; Allison, Michael; Schmunk, Robert (June 30, 2015). "Technical Notes on Mars Solar Time as Adopted by the Mars24 Sunclock". Goddard Institute for Space Studies. National Aeronautics and Space Administration. Archived from the original on September 25, 2015. "the solar hour angle or True Solar Time (TST)") is based on the apparent motion of the actual Sun. It is based on the apparent solar day, the interval between two successive returns of the Sun to the local meridian. Apparent solar time can be crudely measured by a sundial. (Note: The equivalent on Mars is termed Mars local true solar time (LTST).)

The length of a solar day varies through the year, and the accumulated effect produces seasonal deviations of up to 16 minutes from the mean. The effect has two main causes. First, due to the eccentricity of Earth's orbit, Earth moves faster when it is nearest the Sun (perihelion) and slower when it is farthest from the Sun (aphelion) (see Kepler's laws of planetary motion). Second, due to Earth's axial tilt (known as the obliquity of the ecliptic), the Sun's annual motion is along a great circle (the ecliptic) that is tilted to Earth's celestial equator. When the Sun crosses the equator at both equinoxes, the Sun's daily shift (relative to the background stars) is at an angle to the equator, so the projection of this shift onto the equator is less than its average for the year; when the Sun is farthest from the equator at both solstices, the Sun's shift in position from one day to the next is parallel to the equator, so the projection onto the equator of this shift is larger than the average for the year (see tropical year). In June and December when the sun is farthest from the celestial equator, a given shift along the ecliptic corresponds to a large shift at the equator. Therefore, apparent solar days are shorter in March and September than in June or December.

Length of apparent solar day (1998)
Date	Duration in mean solar time
February 11	24 hours
March 26	24 hours − 18.1 seconds
May 14	24 hours
June 19	24 hours + 13.1 seconds
July 25/26	24 hours
September 16	24 hours − 21.3 seconds
November 2/3	24 hours
December 22	24 hours + 29.9 seconds

These lengths will change slightly in a few years and significantly in thousands of years.

== Mean solar time ==
The equation of time—above the x-axis a sundial will appear fast relative to a clock showing local mean time, and below the axis a sundial will appear slow.

Mean solar time is the hour angle of the mean position of the Sun, plus 12 hours. This 12 hour offset comes from the decision to make each day start at midnight for civil purposes, whereas the hour angle or the mean sun is measured from the local meridian. As of 2009, this is realized with the UT1 time scale, constructed mathematically from very-long-baseline interferometry observations of the diurnal motions of radio sources located in other galaxies, and other observations. The duration of daylight varies during the year but the length of a mean solar day is nearly constant, unlike that of an apparent solar day. An apparent solar day can be 20 seconds shorter or 30 seconds longer than a mean solar day. Long or short days occur in succession, so the difference builds up until mean time is ahead of apparent time by about 14 minutes near February 6, and behind apparent time by about 16 minutes near November 3. The equation of time is this difference, which is cyclical and does not accumulate from year to year.

Mean time follows the mean sun. Jean Meeus describes the mean sun as follows:

Consider a first fictitious Sun travelling along the ecliptic with a constant speed and coinciding with the true sun at the perigee and apogee (when the Earth is in perihelion and aphelion, respectively). Then consider a second fictitious Sun travelling along the celestial equator at a constant speed and coinciding with the first fictitious Sun at the equinoxes. This second fictitious sun is the mean Sun.

The length of the mean solar day is slowly increasing due to the tidal acceleration of the Moon by Earth and the corresponding slowing of Earth's rotation by the Moon.

== History ==
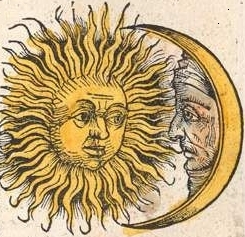
Sun and Moon, Nuremberg Chronicle, 1493

The sun has always been visible in the sky, and its position forms the basis of apparent solar time, the timekeeping method used in antiquity. An Egyptian obelisk constructed c. 3500 BC, a gnomon in China dated 2300 BC, and an Egyptian sundial dated 1500 BC are some of the earliest methods for measuring the sun's position.

Babylonian astronomers knew that the hours of daylight varied throughout the year. A tablet from 649 BC shows that they used a 2:1 ratio for the longest day to the shortest day, and estimated the variation using a linear zigzag function. It is not clear if they knew of the variation in the length of the solar day and the corresponding equation of time. Ptolemy clearly distinguishes the mean solar day and apparent solar day in his Almagest (2nd century), and he tabulated the equation of time in his Handy Tables.

Apparent solar time grew less useful as commerce increased and mechanical clocks improved. Mean solar time was introduced in almanacs in England in 1834 and in France in 1835. Because the sun was difficult to observe directly due to its large size in the sky, mean solar time was determined as a fixed ratio of time as observed by the stars, which used point-like observations. A specific standard for measuring "mean solar time" from midnight came to be called Universal Time.

Conceptually Universal Time is the rotation of the Earth with respect to the sun and hence is mean solar time. However, UT1, the version in common use since 1955, uses a slightly different definition of rotation that corrects for the motion of Earth's poles as it rotates. The difference between this corrected mean solar time and Coordinated Universal Time (UTC) determines whether a leap second is needed. (Since 1972 the UTC time scale has run on SI seconds, and the SI second, when adopted, was already a little shorter than the current value of the second of mean solar time.)

== See also ==
- Local mean time
- Meridian circle
- Earth rotation
- Synodic day
