= Fanzago's astronomical clock =

Coordinates: 45°53′27″N 9°56′52″E

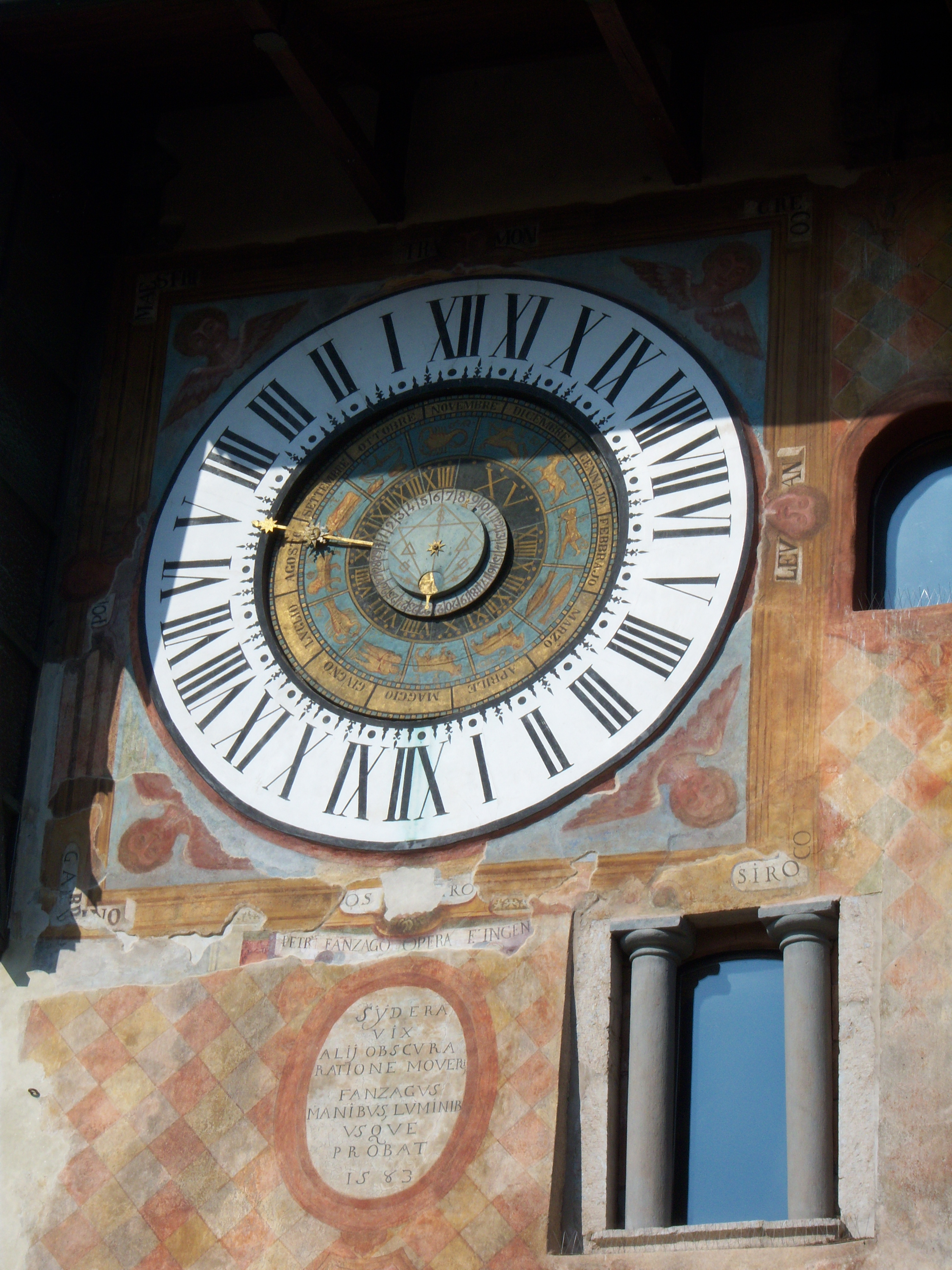
Fanzago's astronomical clock, Clusone

Fanzago's astronomical clock is an astronomical clock in Clusone, Italy. It is housed in a medieval tower in the southwest corner of the Palazzo Comunale. Dating from 1583, it was designed by local mathematician Pietro Fanzago, and still runs on its original mechanism, with restorations in 1873, 1928 and 2006.

The clock's dial has a diameter of 3.5 metres (11 ft). It has a single hand, which rotates anticlockwise, and three concentric rotating rings inside the chapter ring. The dial indicates the hour, the day, the month, the position of the Sun and Moon in the zodiac, the moon phase, and the duration of the hours of darkness through the year.

The inscription underneath the dial is in Latin:

SYDERA VIX ALII OBSCURA RATIONE MOVERI
FANZAGUS MANIBUS, LUMINIBUSQUE PROBAT
1583

That the stars are hardly moved by an obscure cause,
Fanzago demonstrates by his hands and his genius.
1583
