= Turner stability class =

The Turner stability class or Turner stability index is a classification of atmospheric stability over an interval of time based on measurements of surface-level wind speed and net solar radiation. Classes range from 1 (most unstable) to 7 (most stable). The Turner stability class system was devised by D. B. Turner as a modification of the Pasquill stability class system.

The following table is used to determine the Turner stability class for a given wind speed and net solar radiation:

Determining the Turner stability class requires first computing the net solar radiation index according to the procedure outlined in Turner (1961) and Turner (1964).

Turner Stability Class
| Wind speed (knots) | Net radiation index | | | | | | |
| Wind speed (knots) | 4 | 3 | 2 | 1 | 0 | -1 | -2 |
|---|---|---|---|---|---|---|---|
| 0, 1 | 1 | 1 | 2 | 3 | 4 | 6 | 7 |
| 2, 3 | 1 | 2 | 2 | 3 | 4 | 6 | 7 |
| 4, 5 | 1 | 2 | 3 | 4 | 4 | 5 | 6 |
| 6 | 2 | 2 | 3 | 4 | 4 | 5 | 6 |
| 7 | 2 | 2 | 3 | 4 | 4 | 4 | 5 |
| 8, 9 | 2 | 3 | 3 | 4 | 4 | 4 | 5 |
| 10 | 3 | 3 | 4 | 4 | 4 | 4 | 5 |
| 11 | 3 | 3 | 4 | 4 | 4 | 4 | 4 |
| ≥ 12 | 3 | 4 | 4 | 4 | 4 | 4 | 4 |

The net radiation index is determined by following a procedure (see flowchart) that takes into account the cloud cover, ceiling height, and solar altitude.
