= Effect of Sun angle on climate =

The amount of heat energy received at any location on the globe is a direct effect of Sun angle on climate, as the solar zenith angle (the angle of incidence at which sunlight strikes Earth) varies by location, time of day, and season due to Earth's orbit around the Sun and Earth's rotation around its tilted axis. Seasonal change in the angle of sunlight, caused by the tilt of Earth's axis, is the basic mechanism that results in warmer weather in summer than in winter. Change in day length is another factor (albeit lesser).

== Geometry of Sun angle ==
Figure 1 This diagram illustrates how sunlight is spread over a greater area in the polar regions. In addition to the density of incident light, the dissipation of light in the atmosphere is greater when it falls at a shallow angle.

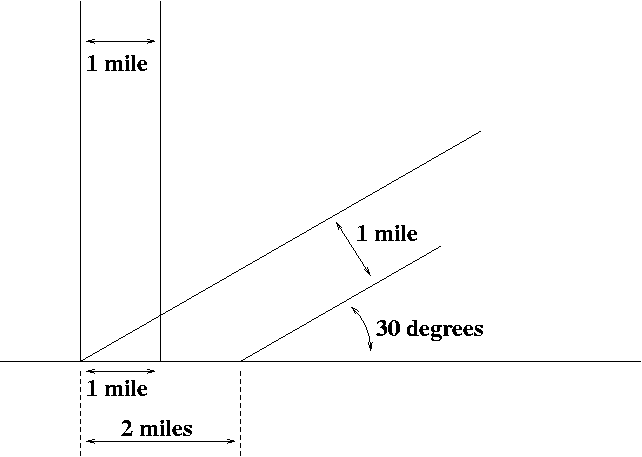
Figure 2 One sunbeam one mile wide shines on the ground at a 90° angle, and another at a 30° angle. The one at a shallower angle covers twice as much area with the same amount of light energy.

Figure 1 presents a case when sunlight shines on Earth at a lower angle (Sun closer to the horizon), the energy of the sunlight is spread over a larger area, and is therefore weaker than if the Sun is higher overhead and the energy is concentrated on a smaller area.

Figure 2 depicts a sunbeam one mile (1.6 km) wide falling on the ground from directly overhead, and another hitting the ground at a 30° angle. Trigonometry tells us that the sine of a 30° angle is 1/2, whereas the sine of a 90° angle is 1. Therefore, the sunbeam hitting the ground at a 30° angle spreads the same amount of light over twice as much area (if we imagine the Sun shining from the south at noon, the north–south width doubles; the east–west width does not). Consequently, the amount of light falling on each square mile is only half as much.

Figure 3 This is a diagram of the seasons. Regardless of the time of day (i.e. Earth's rotation on its axis), the North Pole will be dark, and the South Pole will be illuminated; see also arctic winter.

Figure 3 shows the angle of sunlight striking Earth in the Northern and Southern Hemispheres when Earth's northern axis is tilted away from the Sun, when it is winter in the north and summer in the south.

== Obliquity, seasonality, and climate ==
Differing sun angle results in differing temperatures between lower and higher latitudes, and between winter and summer at the same latitude (although "winter" and "summer" are more complicated in the tropics. (Note: Consider: the equator and the poles (indeed all places on Earth) average around 12*365 = 24*182.5 hours of daylight per year. Yet, the equator's coolest is far warmer than the poles' warmest. The gap can only be due to the angle of the sun, not time under daylight.)

At fixed latitude, the size of the seasonal difference in sun angle (and thus the seasonal temperature variation) is equal to double the Earth's axial tilt. For example, with an axial tilt is 23°, and at a latitude of 45°, then the summer's peak sun angle is 68° (giving sin(68°) = 93% insolation at the surface), while winter's least sun angle is 22° (giving sin(22°) = 37% insolation at the surface). Thus, the greater the axial tilt, the stronger the seasons' variations at a given latitude.

Seasonal differences in the Sun's declination, as viewed from the mid-northern city of New York, New York

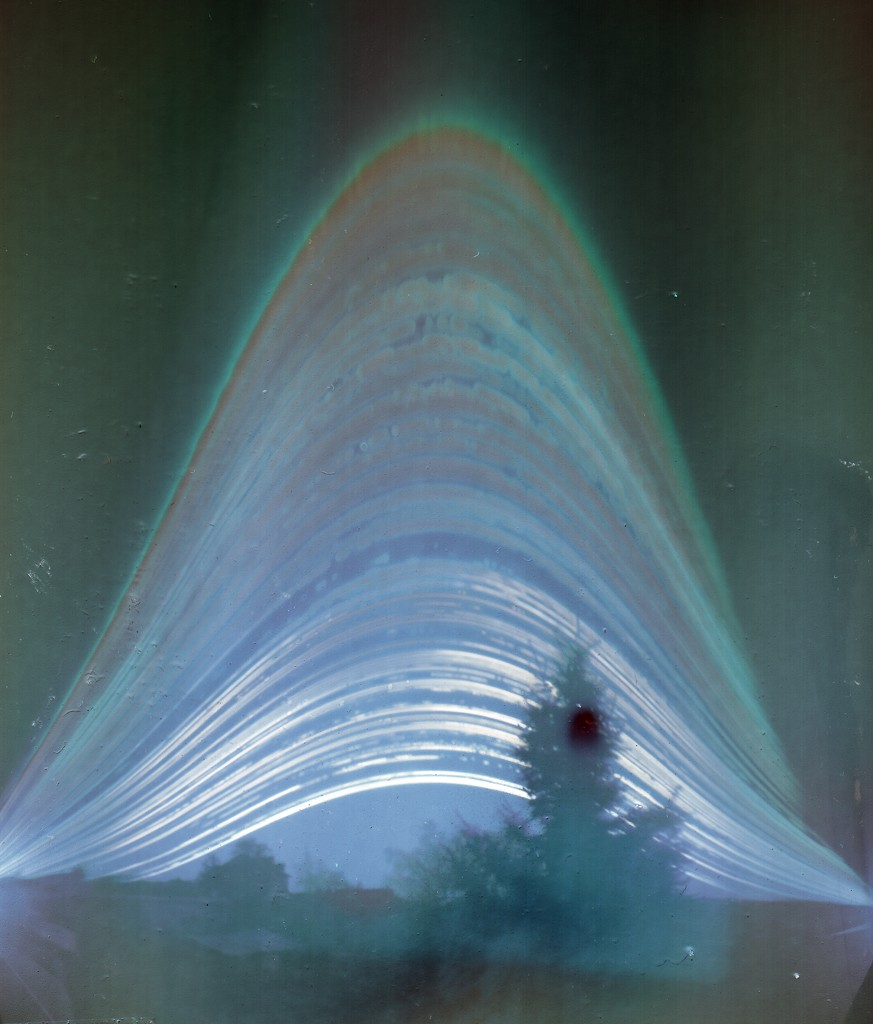
This solargraph exposed over the course of a year shows the Sun's paths of diurnal motion, as seen from Budapest in 2014.

In addition to seasonal variation at fixed latitude, the total annual surface) insolation as a function of latitude also depends on the axial tilt. At the equator (0° latitude), on the equinoxes, the sun angle is always 90° no matter the axial tilt, while on the solstices the minimum sun angle is equal to 90° minus the tilt. Therefore, greater tilt means a lower minimum for the same maximum: less total annual surface insolation at the equator. At the poles (90° latitude), on the equinoxes and during polar night, the sun angle is always 0° or less no matter the axial tilt, while on the summer solstice, the maximum angle is equal to the tilt. Therefore, greater tilt means a higher maximum for the same minimum: more total annual surface insolation at the poles. Therefore, lesser tilt means a wider annual temperature gap between equator and poles, while greater tilt means a smaller annual temperature gap between equator and poles. (At an extreme tilt, such as that of Uranus, the poles can receive similar annual surface insolation to the equator.) In particular, at Earth temperatures, and all else being equal, greater tilt warms the poles and thus reduces polar ice coverage, while lesser tilt cools the poles and thus increases polar ice coverage.

This graph shows a very simple approximation of relative solar-noon heating on Earth as a function of season and latitude, as resulting from the geometry of the sun elevation angle.

One of the first to publish on these effects was Milutin Milanković; the cyclic effects of axial tilt, eccentricity, and other orbital parameters upon global climate were named Milanković cycles. Although individual mechanisms (such as axial tilt and sun angle) are thought to be understood, the overall impact of orbital forcing on global climate remains poorly constrained.

== See also ==
- Sun path
- Axial tilt
- Solar irradiance (insolation)
- Orbital forcing
- Milanković cycles
