= Solar azimuth angle =

Azimuth angle of the Sun's position

The solar azimuth angle is the azimuth (horizontal angle with respect to north) of the Sun's position. This horizontal coordinate defines the Sun's relative direction along the local horizon, whereas the solar zenith angle (or its complementary angle solar elevation) defines the Sun's apparent altitude.

== Conventional sign and origin ==
There are several conventions for the solar azimuth; however, it is traditionally defined as the angle between a line due south and the shadow cast by a vertical rod on Earth. This convention states the angle is positive if the shadow is east of south and negative if it is west of south. For example, due east would be 90° and due west would be -90°. Another convention is the reverse; it also has the origin at due south, but measures angles clockwise, so that due east is now negative and west now positive.

However, despite tradition, the most commonly accepted convention for analyzing solar irradiation, e.g. for solar energy applications, is clockwise from due north, so east is 90°, south is 180°, and west is 270°. This is the definition used by NREL in their solar position calculators and is also the convention used in the formulas presented here. However, Landsat photos and other USGS products, while also defining azimuthal angles relative to due north, take counterclockwise angles as negative.

== Conventional Trigonometric Formulas ==
The following formulas assume the north-clockwise convention. The solar azimuth angle can be calculated to a good approximation with the following formula, however angles should be interpreted with care because the inverse sine, i.e. x = sin^{−1} y or x = arcsin y, has multiple solutions, only one of which will be correct.

$$\sin \phi_\mathrm{s} = \frac{-\sin h \cos \delta}{\sin \theta_\mathrm{s}}.$$

The following formulas can also be used to approximate the solar azimuth angle, but these formulas use cosine, so the azimuth angle as shown by a calculator will always be positive, and should be interpreted as the angle between zero and 180 degrees when the hour angle, h, is negative (morning) and the angle between 180 and 360 degrees when the hour angle, h, is positive (afternoon). (These two formulas are equivalent if one assumes the "solar elevation angle" approximation formula).

$$\begin{align}
\cos \phi_\mathrm{s} &= \frac{\sin \delta \cos \Phi - \cos h \cos \delta \sin \Phi}{\sin \theta_\mathrm{s}} \\[5pt]
\cos \phi_\mathrm{s} &= \frac{\sin \delta - \cos \theta_\mathrm{s}\sin \Phi}{\sin \theta_\mathrm{s}\cos \Phi}.
\end{align}$$

So practically speaking, the compass azimuth which is the practical value used everywhere (in example in airlines as the so called course) on a compass (where North is 0 degrees, East is 90 degrees, South is 180 degrees and West is 270 degrees) can be calculated as

$$\text{compass } \phi_\mathrm{s} = 360 - \phi_\mathrm{s}.$$

The formulas use the following terminology:

- $\phi_\mathrm{s}$ is the solar azimuth angle
- $\theta_\mathrm{s}$ is the solar zenith angle
- $h$ is the hour angle, in the local solar time
- $\delta$ is the current sun declination
- $\Phi$ is the local latitude

In addition, dividing the above sine formula by the first cosine formula gives one the tangent formula as is used in The Nautical Almanac.

Since sine, cosine and tangent are not injective functions, the inverse of each does not give a unique correct solution, and additional conditions are thus needed to get the unique solution. The following formula that employs the atan2 function, however, avoids this confusion and directly gives the unique correct solution for each instance.

== The formula based on the subsolar point and the atan2 function ==
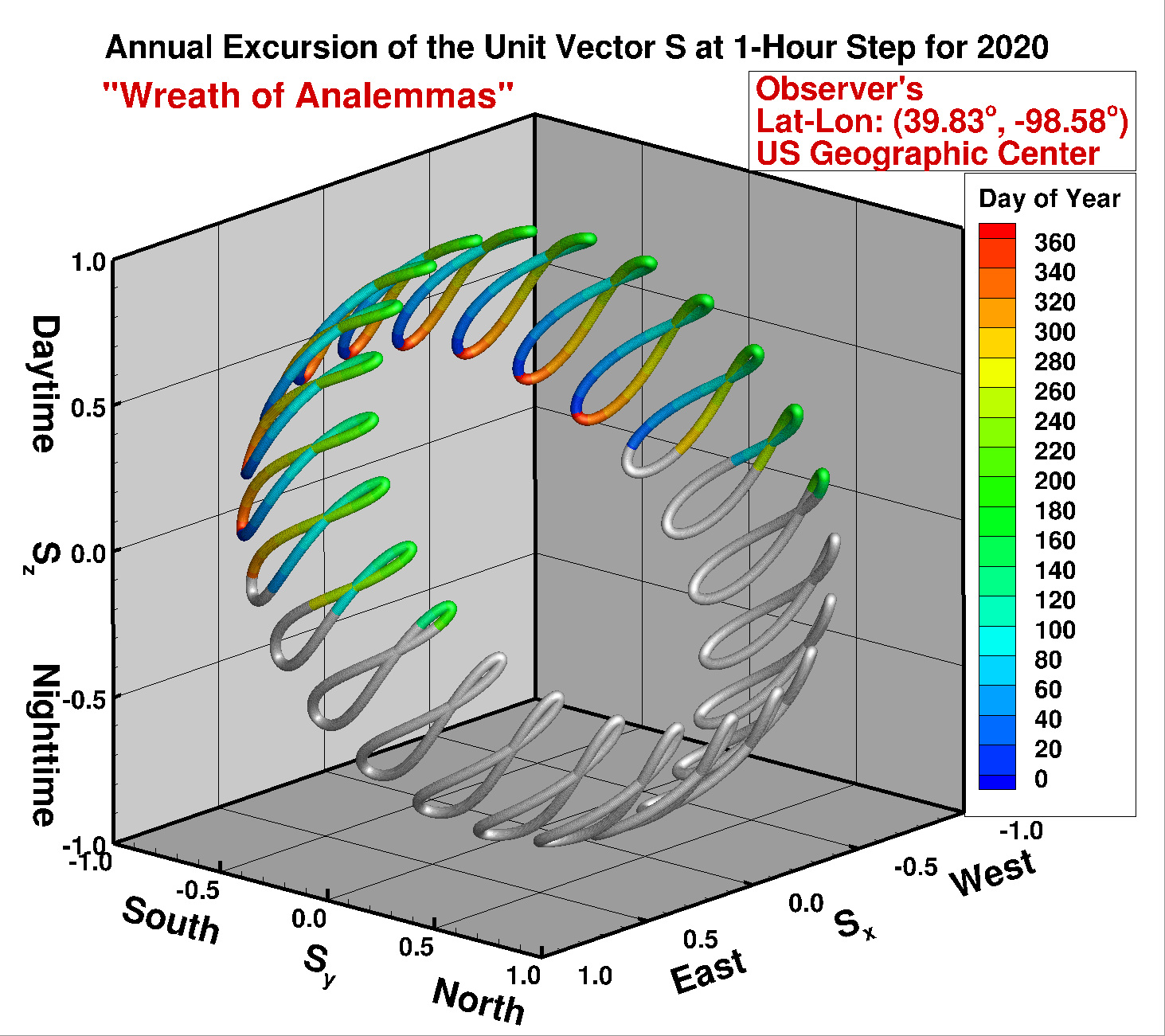
"Wreath of Analemmas". The annual excursion of the position of the Sun defined by the triplet $S_{x}$, $S_{y}$ and $S_{z}$ at 1-hour step as viewed at the geographic center of the contiguous United States. The gray part indicates it is nighttime.

A 2021 publication presents a method that uses a solar azimuth formula based on the subsolar point and the atan2 function, as defined in Fortran 90, that gives an unambiguous solution without the need for circumstantial treatment. The subsolar point is the point on the surface of the Earth where the Sun is overhead. In addition to solar azimuth angle, this method gives the solar zenith angle simultaneously.

The method first calculates the declination of the Sun and equation of time using equations from The Astronomical Almanac, then it gives the x-, y- and z-components of the unit vector pointing toward the Sun, through vector analysis rather than spherical trigonometry, as follows:

$$\begin{align}
\phi_{s} &= \delta, \\
\lambda_{s} &= -15(T_\mathrm{GMT}-12+E_\mathrm{min}/60), \\
S_{x} &= \cos \phi_{s} \sin (\lambda_{s}-\lambda_{o}), \\
S_{y} &= \cos \phi_{o} \sin \phi_{s} - \sin \phi_{o} \cos \phi_{s} \cos (\lambda_{s}-\lambda_{o}), \\
S_{z} &= \sin \phi_{o} \sin \phi_{s} + \cos \phi_{o} \cos \phi_{s} \cos (\lambda_{s}-\lambda_{o}).
\end{align}$$

where

- $\delta$ is the declination of the Sun,
- $\phi_{s}$ is the latitude of the subsolar point,
- $\lambda_{s}$ is the longitude of the subsolar point,
- $T_\mathrm{GMT}$ is the Greenwich Mean Time or UTC,
- $E_\mathrm{min}$ is the equation of time in minutes,
- $\phi_{o}$ is the latitude of the observer,
- $\lambda_{o}$ is the longitude of the observer,
- $S_{x}, S_{y}, S_{z}$ are the x-, y- and z-components, respectively, of the unit vector pointing toward the Sun. The x-, y- and z-axes of the coordinate system point to East, North and upward, respectively.

It can be shown that $S_{x}^{2}+S_{y}^{2}+S_{z}^{2}=1$. With the above mathematical setup, the solar zenith angle and solar azimuth angle are simply

$$Z = \mathrm{acos}(S_{z})$$,
$\gamma_{s} = \mathrm{atan2}(-S_{x}, -S_{y})$. (South-Clockwise Convention)

where

- $Z$ is the solar zenith angle,
- $\gamma_{s}$ is the solar azimuth angle following the South-Clockwise Convention.

If one prefers North-Clockwise Convention, or East-Counterclockwise Convention, the formulas are

$\gamma_{s} = \mathrm{atan2}(S_{x}, S_{y})$, (North-Clockwise Convention)
$\gamma_{s} = \mathrm{atan2}(S_{y}, S_{x})$. (East-Counterclockwise Convention)

Finally, the values of $S_{x}$, $S_{y}$ and $S_{z}$ at 1-hour step for an entire year can be presented in a 3D plot of "wreath of analemmas" as a graphic depiction of all possible positions of the Sun in terms of solar zenith angle and solar azimuth angle for any given location. Refer to sun path for similar plots for other locations.

The solar azimuth angle can be used to find the directions of sunrise and sunset at Stonehenge (𝜙 is its latitude and 𝜀 is Earth's axial tilt)

== See also ==
- Equation of time
- Horizontal coordinate system
- Hour angle
- Position of the Sun
- Solar time
- Solar tracker
- Sun path
- Sunrise
- Sunset
- Zenith
