= Solar Radiation and Climate Experiment =

NASA experiment to measure radiation from the Sun

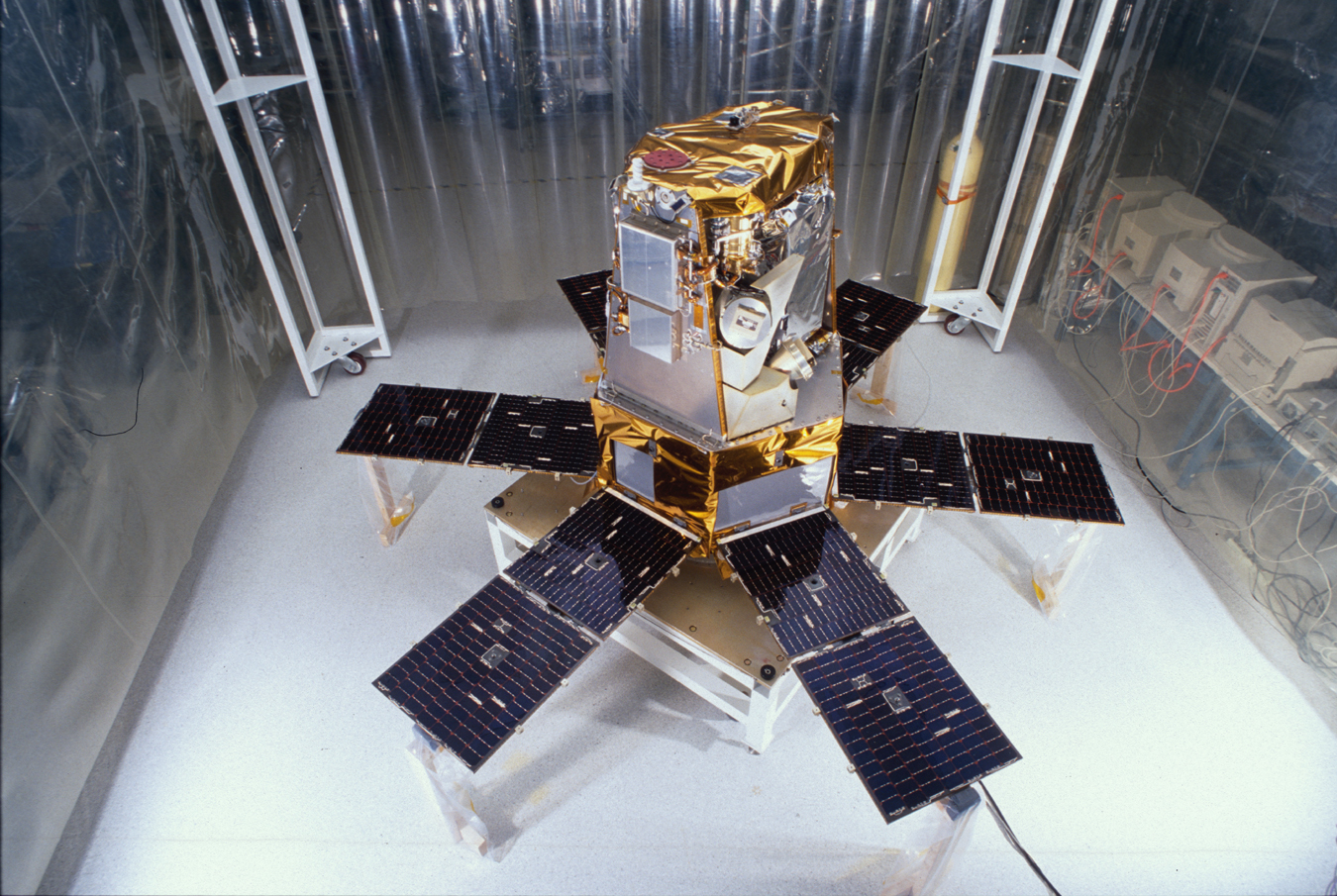
- Solar Radiation and Climate Experiment satellite
- Names: SORCE
- Mission type: Astrophysics
- Operator: NASA, LASP at University of Colorado Boulder
- COSPAR ID: 2003-004A
- SATCAT no.: 27651
- Website: https://lasp.colorado.edu/sorce/
- Mission duration: 5 years (planned); 22 years, 2 months and 1 day (in orbit)

Spacecraft properties
- Spacecraft type: Solar Radiation and Climate Experiment
- Launch mass: 315 kg (694 lb)
- Dry mass: 290 kg (640 lb)

Start of mission
- Launch date: 25 January 2003, 20:13:35 UTC
- Rocket: Pegasus XL
- Launch site: Cape Canaveral (CCAFS), Lockheed L-1011 TriStar
- Contractor: Orbital Sciences Corporation

End of mission
- Disposal: Decay in 2032 (planned)
- Deactivated: 25 February 2020

Orbital parameters
- Reference system: Geocentric orbit
- Regime: Geosynchronous orbit
- Altitude: 645 km (401 mi)
- Inclination: 40.00°
- Period: 97.19 minutes

Instruments
- TIM - Total Irradiance Monitor; SOLSTICE - Solar Stellar Irradiance Comparison Experiment; SIM - Spectral Irradiance Monitor; XPS = XUV Photometer System

The Solar Radiation and Climate Experiment (SORCE) was a 2003–2020 NASA-sponsored satellite mission that measured incoming X-ray, ultraviolet, visible, near-infrared, and total solar radiation. These measurements specifically addressed long-term climate change, natural variability, atmospheric ozone, and UV-B radiation, enhancing climate prediction. These measurements are critical to studies of the Sun, its effect on the Earth's system, and its influence on humankind. SORCE was launched on 25 January 2003 on a Pegasus XL launch vehicle to provide NASA's Earth Science Enterprise (ESE) with precise measurements of solar radiation.

SORCE measured the Sun's output using radiometers, spectrometers, photodiodes, detectors, and bolometers mounted on a satellite observatory orbiting the Earth. Spectral measurements identify the irradiance of the Sun by characterizing the Sun's energy and emissions in the form of color that can then be translated into quantities and elements of matter. Data obtained by SORCE can be used to model the Sun's output and to explain and predict the effect of the Sun's radiation on the Earth's atmosphere and climate.

Flying in a 645 km (401 mi) orbit at a 40.0° inclination, SORCE was operated by the Laboratory for Atmospheric and Space Physics (LASP) at the University of Colorado Boulder, Colorado. It continued the precise measurements of total solar irradiance that had begun with the ERB instrument in 1979 and had been later extended with the ACRIM series of measurements (1999+). SORCE provided measurements of the solar spectral irradiance from 1 to 2000 nm, accounting for 95% of the spectral contribution to the total solar irradiance.

== Objectives ==
The science objectives of the SORCE mission were:

- To make accurate measurements with high precision of total solar irradiance, connect them to previous TSI measurements, and continue this long-term climate record. Provide TSI with an accuracy of 0.01% (100 parts per million) based on SI units and with long-term repeatability of 0.001%/yr.
- To make daily measurements of the solar ultraviolet irradiance from 120 to 300 nm, with a spectral resolution of 1 nm. Achieve this spectral irradiance measurement with an accuracy of better than 5%, and with long-term repeatability of 0.5%/yr. Use the solar/stellar comparison technique to relate the solar irradiance to the ensemble average flux from a number of bright, early-type stars (same stars used by the Upper Atmosphere Research Satellite (UARS) SOLSTICE program).
- To make the first measurements of the visible and near-infrared solar irradiance with sufficient precision for future climate studies. Obtain daily measurements of solar spectral irradiance between 0.3 and 2 μm with a spectral resolution of at least 1/30, an accuracy of 0.03%, and long-term repeatability of better than 0.01%/yr.
- To improve the understanding of how and why solar irradiance varies, estimate past and future solar behavior, and investigate climate responses.

== Experiments ==
SORCE carried four instruments, including the Total Irradiance Monitor (TIM), Solar Stellar Irradiance Comparison Experiment (SOLSTICE), Spectral Irradiance Monitor (SIM), and the XUV Photometer System (XPS):

=== Total Irradiation Monitor (TIM) ===
TIM (Total Irradiation Monitor) was a 7.9 kg, 14 watts instrument that covered all visual and infrared wavelengths at an irradiance accuracy of one part in 10000. It used differential, heat-sensitive resistors as detectors.

=== Spectral Irradiance Monitor (SIM) ===
SIM (Spectral Irradiance Monitor) was a 22 kg, 25 watts rotating Fery prism spectrometer with a bolometer output that covered the 200-2400 nm band at a resolution of a few nm, and at an irradiance accuracy of three parts in ten thousand.

=== Solar Stellar Irradiance Comparison Experiment (SOLSTICE) ===
SOLSTICE (SOlar STellar Irradiance Comparison Experiment) A and B are 36 kg, 33 watts, UV grating spectrometers with photomultiplier detectors that covered the 115-320 nm band at a resolution of 0.1 nm, and at an irradiance accuracy of about 4%. It used an ensemble of bright stars (selected for their stable luminosities) as calibrators for the instrument variability.

== Extreme Ultraviolet Photometer System (XPS) ==
XPS (XUV Photometer System) was a 3.6 kg, 9 watts photometer which invoked filters to monitor the X-ray and UV band at 1-34 nm, at a resolution of about seven nm, and at an irradiance accuracy of about 15%.

== End of mission ==
NASA decommissioned SORCE on 25 February 2020, after 17 years of operation (over three times the original design life of five years). The spacecraft had struggled with battery degradation problems since 2011, which prevented SORCE from conducting measurements full-time. Ground teams switched to daytime-only observations, effectively allowing SORCE to operate with no functioning battery through its solar panels.

NASA planned to keep operating SORCE until a replacement could be developed and launched. The Glory satellite, which would have continued SORCE's observations, was lost in a launch failure in 2011. A stopgap solar irradiance instrument, the Total Solar Irradiance Calibration Transfer Experiment (TCTE), was launched in November 2013 on the U.S. Air Force's STPSat-3, but a full replacement for SORCE did not launch until December 2017, when the Total and Spectral solar Irradiance Sensor (TSIS-1 and TSIS-2) was delivered to the International Space Station (ISS).

Left to drift in orbit, SORCE is projected to re-enter the atmosphere in 2032, with most of the spacecraft expected to burn up during re-entry.

== See also ==
- Upper Atmosphere Research Satellite
