= Solar zenith angle =

Angle between the zenith and the centre of the Sun's disc

The solar zenith angle is the zenith angle of the Sun, i.e., the angle between the sun’s rays and the vertical direction. It is the complement to the solar altitude or solar elevation, which is the altitude angle or elevation angle between the Sun’s rays and a horizontal plane. Near (but usually not exactly at) solar noon, the zenith angle is at a minimum and is equal to the absolute value of latitude minus solar declination angle. This is the basis by which ancient mariners navigated the oceans.

Solar zenith angle is normally used in combination with the solar azimuth angle to determine the position of the Sun as observed from a given location on the surface of the Earth.

== Formula ==
$$\cos \theta_s = \sin \alpha_s = \sin \Phi \sin \delta + \cos \Phi \cos \delta \cos h$$

where

- $\theta_s$ is the solar zenith angle
- $\alpha_s$ is the solar altitude angle, $\alpha_s = 90^\circ - \theta_s$
- $h$ is the hour angle, in the local solar time.
- $\delta$ is the current declination of the Sun
- $\Phi$ is the local latitude.

This equation is equivalent to the formula for the angle between vectors in spherical coordinates applied to the local normal and the direction to the sun, with the adjustment that the latitude is the complement to the polar angle and that the hour angle is the difference of azimuths.

At solar noon, this reads
$$\cos \theta_s = \sin \Phi \sin \delta + \cos \Phi \cos \delta = \cos(\Phi - \delta)$$
where we have used the difference identity for cosine.

Therefore at solar noon, $\theta_s = \Phi - \delta$

== Derivation of the formula using the subsolar point and vector analysis ==
While the formula can be derived by applying the cosine law to the zenith-pole-Sun spherical triangle, the spherical trigonometry is a relatively esoteric subject.

By introducing the coordinates of the subsolar point and using vector analysis, the formula can be obtained straightforward without incurring the use of spherical trigonometry.

In the Earth-Centered Earth-Fixed (ECEF) geocentric Cartesian coordinate system, let $(\phi_{s}, \lambda_{s})$ and $(\phi_{o}, \lambda_{o})$ be the latitudes and longitudes, or coordinates, of the subsolar point and the observer's point, then the upward-pointing unit vectors at the two points, $\mathbf{S}$ and $\mathbf{V}_{oz}$, are

$$\mathbf{S}=\cos\phi_{s}\cos\lambda_{s}{\mathbf i}+\cos\phi_{s}\sin\lambda_{s}{\mathbf j}+\sin\phi_{s}{\mathbf k},$$
$$\mathbf{V}_{oz}=\cos\phi_{o}\cos\lambda_{o}{\mathbf i}+\cos\phi_{o}\sin\lambda_{o}{\mathbf j}+\sin\phi_{o}{\mathbf k}.$$

where ${\mathbf i}$, ${\mathbf j}$ and ${\mathbf k}$ are the basis vectors in the ECEF coordinate system.

Now the cosine of the solar zenith angle, $\theta_{s}$, is simply the dot product of the above two vectors

$$\cos\theta_{s} = \mathbf{S}\cdot\mathbf{V}_{oz} = \sin\phi_{o}\sin\phi_{s} + \cos\phi_{o}\cos\phi_{s}\cos(\lambda_{s}-\lambda_{o}).$$

Note that $\phi_{s}$ is the same as $\delta$, the declination of the Sun, and $\lambda_{s}-\lambda_{o}$ is equivalent to $-h$, where $h$ is the hour angle defined earlier. So the above format is mathematically identical to the one given earlier.

Additionally, Ref. also derived the formula for solar azimuth angle in a similar fashion without using spherical trigonometry.

=== Minimum and Maximum ===
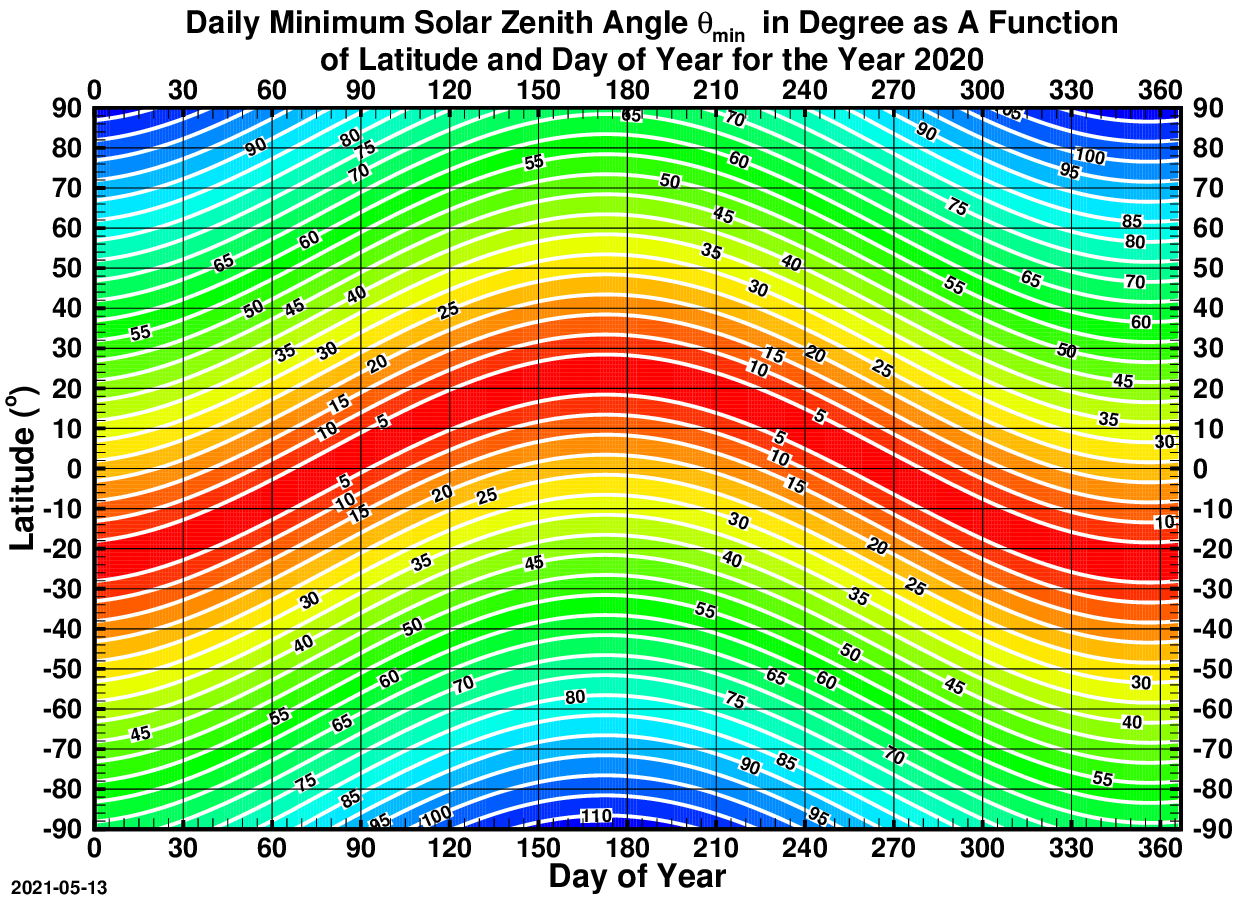
The daily minimum of the solar zenith angle as a function of latitude and day of year for the year 2020.

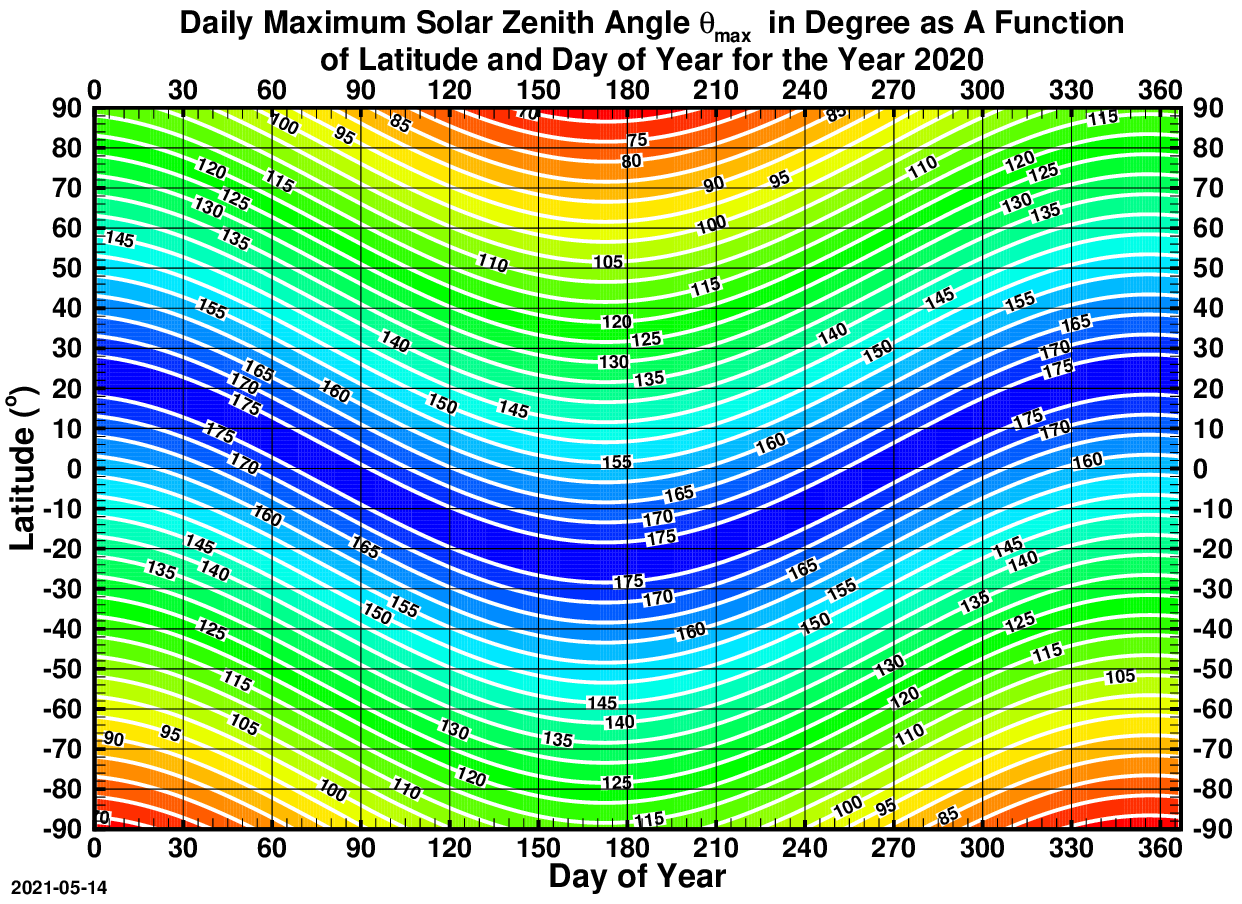
The daily maximum of the solar zenith angle as a function of latitude and day of year for the year 2020.

At any given location on any given day, the solar zenith angle, $\theta_{s}$, reaches its minimum, $\theta_\text{min}$, at local solar noon when the hour angle $h = 0$, or $\lambda_{s}-\lambda_{o}=0$, namely, $\cos\theta_\text{min} = \cos(|\phi_{o}-\phi_{s}|)$, or $\theta_\text{min} = |\phi_{o}-\phi_{s}|$. If $\theta_\text{min} > 90^{\circ}$, it is polar night.

And at any given location on any given day, the solar zenith angle, $\theta_{s}$, reaches its maximum, $\theta_\text{max}$, at local midnight when the hour angle $h = -180^{\circ}$, or $\lambda_{s}-\lambda_{o}=-180^{\circ}$, namely, $\cos\theta_\text{max} = \cos(180^{\circ}-|\phi_{o}+\phi_{s}|)$, or $\theta_\text{max} = 180^{\circ}-|\phi_{o}+\phi_{s}|$. If $\theta_\text{max} < 90^{\circ}$, it is polar day.

=== Caveats ===
The calculated values are approximations due to the distinction between common/geodetic latitude and geocentric latitude. However, the two values differ by less than 12 minutes of arc, which is less than the apparent angular radius of the Sun.

The formula also neglects the effect of atmospheric refraction.

== Applications ==
=== Sunrise/Sunset ===
Sunset and sunrise occur (approximately) when the zenith angle is 90°, where the hour angle h_{0} satisfies
$$\cos h_0 = -\tan \Phi \tan \delta.$$

Precise times of sunset and sunrise occur when the upper limb of the Sun appears, as refracted by the atmosphere, to be on the horizon.

=== Albedo ===
A weighted daily average zenith angle, used in computing the local albedo of the Earth, is given by
$$\overline{\cos \theta_s} = \frac{\displaystyle \int_{-h_0}^{h_0} Q \cos \theta_s \, \text{d}h}{\displaystyle \int_{-h_0}^{h_0} Q \, \text{d}h}$$
where Q is the instantaneous irradiance.

=== Summary of special angles ===
Approximate subsolar point dates vs. latitude superimposed on a world map, the example in blue denoting Lahaina Noon in Honolulu.

For example, the solar elevation angle is:

- 90° at the subsolar point, which occurs, for example, at the equator on a day of equinox at solar noon
- near 0° at the sunset or at the sunrise
- between −90° and 0° during the night (midnight)

An exact calculation is given in position of the Sun. Other approximations exist elsewhere.

== See also ==
- Azimuth
- Solar azimuth angle
- Horizontal coordinate system
- List of orbits
- Photovoltaic mounting system § Orientation and inclination
- Position of the Sun
- Sun path
- Sunrise
- Sunset
- Sun transit time
