= List of telescope parts and construction =

This article lists the major hardware components, software systems, and support equipment involved in telescope construction and operation, including mounts, optics such as mirrors and lenses, eyepieces, corrector plates, and control interfaces. The components described apply broadly across telescope types, from amateur refractors to large professional reflecting telescopes.

== Hardware ==
=== Accessories ===
- Finderscope
- Iron sight
- Reflector (reflex) sight
- Cheshire collimator: A simple tool to collimate a telescope

=== Control ===
- Clock drive
- GoTo

=== Mechanical construction ===
- Mirror support cell
- Serrurier truss
- Silvering

=== Mounts ===
- Telescope mount - Types include:
  - Altazimuth mount
  - Equatorial mount
    - Equatorial platform
      - Poncet Platform
    - Fork mount
    - German equatorial mount
    - Springfield mount

=== Optics ===
Mirrors and lenses are the critical light-bending components of a telescope.

- Objective: The first lens or curved mirror that collects and focuses the incoming light.
  - Primary lens: The objective of a refracting telescope.
  - Primary mirror: The objective of a reflecting telescope.
- Corrector plate: A full aperture negative lens placed before a primary mirror designed to correct the optical aberrations of the mirror.
  - Schmidt corrector plate: An aspheric-shaped corrector plate used in the Schmidt telescope.
  - Meniscus corrector: A meniscus-shaped corrector plate usually used in the Maksutov telescope.
- Focusing mask: A full aperture mask temporarily placed before the primary mirror to aid in focusing the telescope.
  - Bahtinov mask
  - Carey mask
  - Hartmann mask
- Sub-aperture corrector: One or a series of corrective lens (sometimes combined with a corrective curved mirror) placed after (near the focus) a primary mirror designed to correct the optical aberrations of the mirror. These can be just a small version of the corrector plate, but since they are usually used in a Cassegrain configuration in front of the secondary mirror they require additional modification since the light passes through them twice.
- Secondary mirror
- Mirror § Instruments
- Curved mirror
- Honeycomb mirror
- Liquid mirror
- Parabolic reflector

Subsequent (sometimes optional) components realign, segment, or in some way modify the light of an incoming image:

- Field lens: A correcting lens placed just before the image plane of a telescope.
- Telecompressor or focal reducer: Optical element to decrease the telescope's focal length and magnification (usually by a fixed percentage) and widen the field of view, providing opposite effects of a Barlow lens.
- Star Diagonal: Used to change the angle of the light coming out of a telescope, for easier viewing.
- Herschel Wedge: Similar to a star diagonal with a wedge-shaped unsilvered prism reflector that reduces incoming light by up to 95% for solar viewing.
- Coma corrector a correcting lens used to reduce coma distortion in fast reflecting telescopes.
- Field flattener a correcting lens used to reduce field curvature in refracting telescopes for astrophotography.
- Barlow lens: Optical element to increase the telescope's focal length and magnification, narrow the field of view and reduce coma distortion, providing opposite effects of a telecompressor.
- Astronomical filter: Used to select specific colors (or light frequencies) for astrophotography.
- Filter wheel: One manner to easily insert filters into the optical train. Mostly used for photography.
- Focuser: Allows the user to adjust the focus by moving the eyepiece along the optical axis.
- Eyepiece: Performs the final focus correction before the light reaches the eye.
- Charge-coupled device (CCD): A light-sensitive integrated circuit digital sensor (commonly used in digital cameras) that turns light into an electrical charge used to collection image data.

Generally applicable to all items:

- Metallizing: A way of coating mirrors for high-efficiency light reflection.
- Optical coating: Thin layers applied to mirrors, filters, and lenses to avoid reflections, as well as absorb certain colors.

== Software and control interfaces ==
- Active optics
- Adaptive optics
- ASCOM
- EQMod
- INDI
- PLate OPtimizer
- Versatile Real-Time Executive

== Support equipment and buildings ==
- Observatory

- Equatorial room

== See also ==
- List of telescope types
- Lists of telescopes
