= Dobsonian telescope =

Type of Newtonian telescope popularized by John Dobson

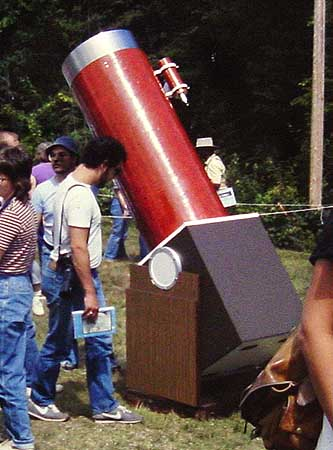
A Dobsonian telescope on display at Stellafane in the early 1980s

A Dobsonian telescope is an altazimuth-mounted Newtonian telescope design popularized by John Dobson in 1965 and credited with vastly increasing the size of telescopes available to amateur astronomers. Dobson's telescopes featured a simplified mechanical design that was easy to manufacture from readily available components to create a large, portable, low-cost telescope. The design is optimized for observing faint deep-sky objects such as nebulae and galaxies. This type of observation requires a large objective diameter (i.e., light-gathering power) of relatively short focal length and portability for travel to less light-polluted locations.

Dobsonians are intended to be what is commonly called a "light bucket". (Note: A light bucket is a telescope with a large aperture, used mainly for visual observing.) Operating at low magnification, the design therefore omits features found in other amateur telescopes such as equatorial tracking. Dobsonians are popular in the amateur telescope making community, wherein the design was pioneered and continues to evolve. A number of commercial telescope makers also sell telescopes based on this design. The term Dobsonian is currently used for a range of large-aperture Newtonian reflectors that use some of the basic Dobsonian design characteristics, regardless of the materials from which they are constructed.

== Origin and design ==
It is hard to classify the Dobsonian telescope as a single invention. In the field of amateur telescope making most, if not all, of its design features had been used before. John Dobson, credited as having invented this design in 1965, pointed out that "for hundreds of years, wars were fought using cannon on 'Dobsonian' mounts".

Dobson identified the characteristic features of the design as lightweight objective mirrors made from porthole glass, and mountings constructed from plywood, Teflon strips and other low-cost materials. Since he built these telescopes as aids in his avocation of instructional sidewalk astronomy, he preferred to call the design a "sidewalk telescope". Dobson combined all these innovations in a design focused towards one goal: building a very large, inexpensive, easy to use, portable telescope, one that could bring deep-sky astronomy to the masses.

=== Dobson's design innovations ===
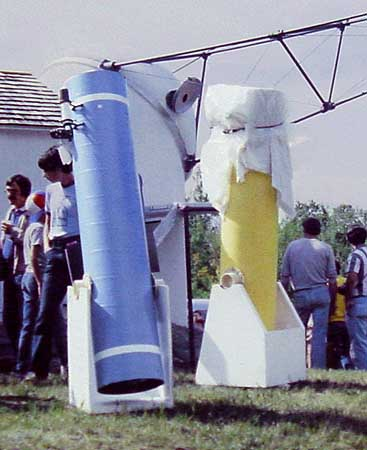
Two amateur built Dobsonians at Stellafane in the early 1980s

Dobson's design allows a builder with minimal skills to make a very large telescope out of common items. Dobson optimized the design for observation of faint objects such as star clusters, nebulae, and galaxies (what amateur astronomers call deep sky objects). These dim objects require a large objective mirror able to gather a large amount of light. Because "deep sky" observing often requires travel to dark locations away from city lights, the design benefits from being more compact, portable, and rugged than standard large Newtonian telescopes of times past, which typically utilized massive German equatorial mounts. John Dobson's telescopes combined several innovations to meet these criteria, including:

- Nontraditional alt-azimuth mount: Instead of a standard mount using axial bearings, Dobson opted for a very stable design that was simple to build, and which had fewer mechanical limitations when used with large and heavy telescopes. He modified the classical fork mount into a free-standing three-piece construction, which holds the telescope steady on seven discrete support points and allows for easy and safe repositioning of a large and heavy telescope.
  - The classical Dobsonian mount (refer to Fig.1) consists of a flat horizontal "ground board" platform (Fig.1, black) on top of which are attached three of the seven supports (Fig.1, bottom yellow). Upon these three supports rests a box construction called a "rocker box" (Fig.1, dark blue). A loose center-bolt (Fig.1, dark green) keeps the rocker box centered and allows it to pivot above the ground board. On opposing sides of the rocker box, semicircular depressions are cut out from the top edge of each wall (the rocker box is open on the top and on the back). Each depression has a widely spaced pair of supports installed in the cut (Fig.1, top yellow). The telescope optical tube assembly (OTA, Fig.1, light blue) has two large round trunnions (or arc-shaped rails for larger telescopes) secured on the left and right sides (Fig.1, red). Their common axis intersects the center of gravity of the telescope OTA. The trunnions (commonly known as altitude bearings) rest atop the aforementioned four supports in the top cutouts of the rocker box. To raise the telescope (altitude), just lift the tube and the trunnions will slide over the four supports. To move the telescope left or right (azimuth), push or pull the top rim of the OTA (some have a dedicated handle) so that the pivoting rocker box slides over the ground board's three supports.
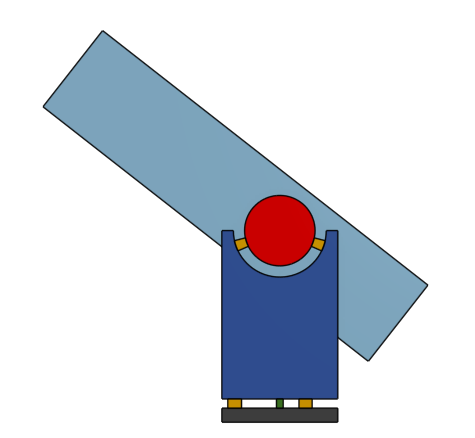
    Fig.1 Dobsonian mount schematics
  - Classical Dobsonian mount parts are typically made from plywood and other cheap materials which are glued, screwed, or even nailed together. In contrast to other telescope mount types, no precision-machined mechanical parts are required. For smooth sliding motions, small Teflon (PTFE) blocks are used for the seven supports. Their surface sizes can be precisely calculated for the particular OTA weight. To improve the smoothness and steady position-holding, the bottom of the rocker box is typically covered with micro-textured Formica. The altitude trunnions often have a large diameter, and can also be covered with textured material. For larger telescopes, semicircular wood pieces or arc-shaped rails can be used instead of round trunnions.
  - The use of Teflon over textured material combines with gravity-produced wedging forces to create a unique smooth action, transitioning from rock steady to smooth motion and back. Thus a clamp mechanism is not needed to prevent unintentional motion of the telescope, unlike most other telescope mounts. The steadiness of the classical Dobsonian is unparalleled, as the telescope is actually not rotating on two axes as other mounts but instead statically standing on seven solid blocks (until pushed to a new position).
- Thin mirrors: Instead of costly Pyrex mirror blanks with the standard 1:6 thickness ratios (1 cm thick for every 6 cm in diameter) so they don't flex and sag out of shape under their own weight, Dobson used mirrors made out of glass from surplus ship porthole covers usually with 1:16 thickness ratios. Since the telescope design has an alt-azimuth mount, the mirror only has to be supported in a simple cell with a backing of indoor/outdoor carpet to evenly support the weight of the much thinner mirror.
- Construction tubes: Dobson replaced the traditional aluminum or fiberglass telescope tube with the thick compressed paper tubes used in construction to pour concrete columns. "Sonotubes", the leading brand employed by Dobson, are less expensive than commercially available telescope tubes and are available in a wide variety of sizes. For protection against moisture, the tubes were usually painted or coated with plastic. Sonotubes are claimed to be more rugged than aluminum or fiberglass tubes which can dent or shatter from impacts during transport. They have the added advantage of being thermally stable and non-conductive, which minimizes unwanted convection currents in the light path caused by handling of the tube assembly.
- A square "mirrorbox": Dobson often used a plywood box for the tube base and mirror housing, into which the tube was inserted. This gave a rigid flat surface to attach the mirror supports, and made it easy to attach the trunnions.

== Characteristics ==
The Dobsonian design has the following characteristics:

- Altazimuth mount: An equatorial telescope mount with clock drive was left out of the design. Equatorial mounts tend to be massive (less portable), expensive, complicated, and have the characteristics of putting the eyepiece of Newtonian telescopes in very hard to access positions. Altazimuth mounts cut the size, weight and cost of the total telescope and keep the eyepiece in a relatively easy to access position on the side of the telescope. The altazimuth mount design used in Dobsonian designs also adds to simplicity and portability; there is no added mass or need to transport counter weights, drive components, or tripods/pedestals. Setting up for hard tube dobs simply involves placing the mount on the ground, and setting the tube on top of it. The weight of the Dobsonian style altazimuth mount is distributed over large simple bearing surfaces so the telescope can move smoothly under finger pressure with minimal backlash.

The altazimuth mount does have its own limitations. Un-driven altazimuth mounted telescopes need to be "nudged" every few minutes along both axes to compensate for the rotation of the Earth to keep an object in view (as opposed to one axis for un-driven equatorial mounts), an exercise that becomes more difficult with higher magnifications. The altazimuth mount does not allow the use of conventional setting circles to help in aiming the telescope at the coordinates of known objects. They are known for being difficult to point at objects near the zenith, mainly because a large movement of the azimuth axis is needed to move the telescope pointing by even a small amount. Altazimuth mounts are also not well suited for astrophotography.

- Large objective diameter compared to mass/cost
  - Low mass to objective size ratio: The Dobsonian design's structure as measured in volume and weight is relatively minimal for any given objective diameter when compared to other designs. (Note: This ratio ensures that per inch of objective diameter, a Dobsonian will weigh less and require less space than other types and is thus the most portable design.)
  - Low cost to objective size ratio: From a cost perspective, a user typically gets more objective diameter per unit of cost with the Dobsonian design.
- Good "Deep Sky" telescope: The Dobsonian design of maximized objective diameter combined with portability makes the design ideal for observing dim star clusters, nebulae, and galaxies (deep sky objects), an activity that requires large objectives and travel to dark sky locations. Since these objects are relatively large, they are observed at low magnifications that do not require a clock-driven mount.
- Balance Issues: Designs that have the telescope tube fixed in relationship to its altitude bearings can be put out of balance by the addition or subtraction of equipment such as cameras, finderscopes or even unusually heavy eyepieces. Most Dobsonian telescopes have enough friction in the bearings to resist a moderate amount of imbalance; however, this friction can also make it difficult to position the telescope accurately. To correct such imbalance, counterweights are sometimes hooked or bolted onto the back of the mirror box.

== Derivative designs ==
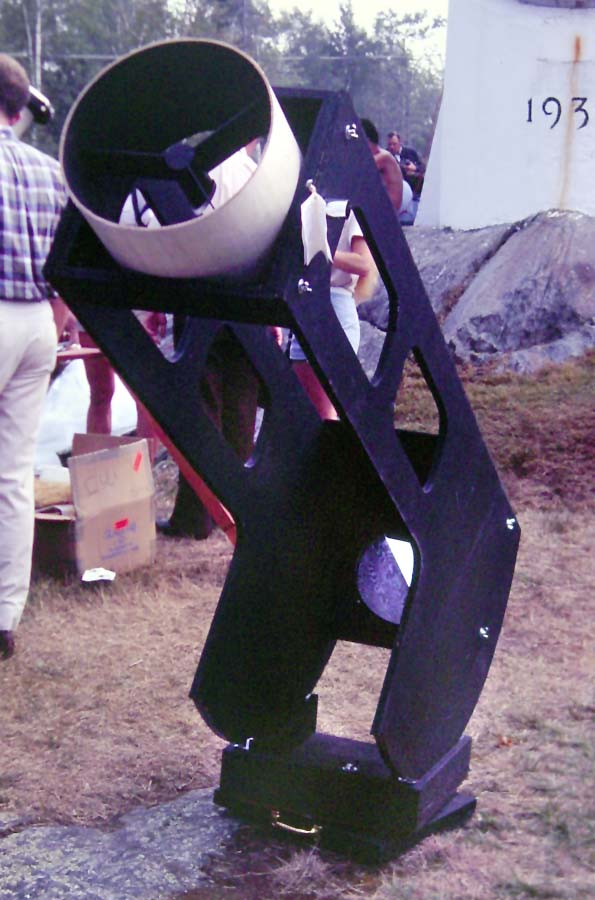
A modified Dobsonian from 1983 that features a collapsible open tube assembly with integrated bearing surface and a very compact "rocker box" mount.

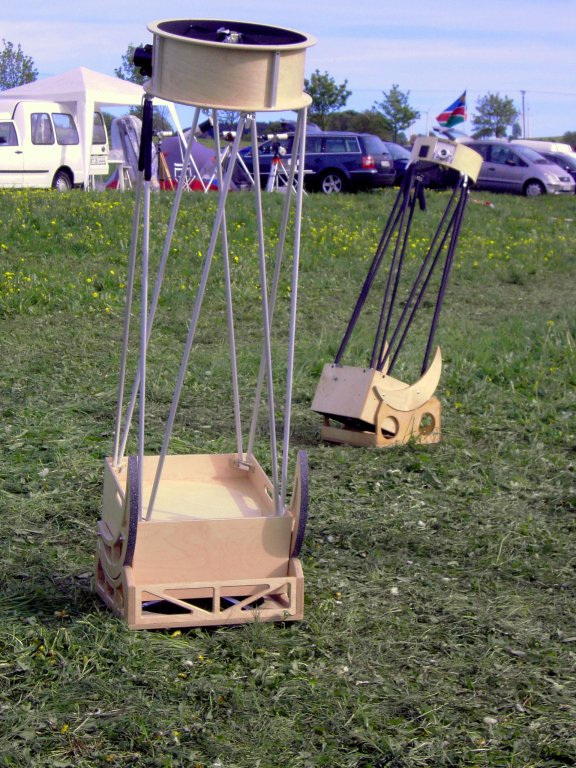
Two Dobsonians that combine a truss tube, compact "rocker box", large radius altitude bearings, and a collapsible design.

From its inception, telescope makers have been modifying the Dobsonian design to fit their needs. The original design fit the needs and available supplies of one person—John Dobson. Other people devised variants that fit their own needs, abilities, and access to parts. This has led to significant diversity in "Dobsonian" design.

=== Collapsible tube assemblies ===
"Classic" design tube assemblies would require a large van for transport. Designers started coming up with disassembleable or collapsible variants that could be brought to the site with a small SUV, hatchback, or even a sedan. This innovation allowed the amateur astronomy community access to even larger apertures.

==== The truss tube ====
Many designs have combined the advantages of a light truss tube and a collapsible design. Collapsible "truss tube" Dobsonians appeared in the amateur telescope making community as early as 1982 and allow the optical tube assembly, the largest component, to be broken down. As the name implies, the "tube" of this design is actually composed of an upper cage assembly, which contains the secondary mirror, and focuser, held in place by several rigid poles over a mirror box which contains the objective mirror. The poles are held in place by quick-disconnecting clamps which allow the entire telescope to be easily broken down into its smaller components, facilitating their transport by vehicle or other means to an observing site. These truss tube designs are sometimes incorrectly called a Serrurier truss, but since the main truss is not built with an opposing mirror cell truss it only performs one function of that design, i.e., keeping the optics parallel.

=== Modifications to the altazimuth mount (rocker box) ===
The main attribute of a Dobsonian's mount is that it resembles a "gun carriage" configuration with a "rocker box" consisting of a horizontal trunnion style altitude axis and a broadly supported azimuth axis, both making use of material such as plastic, Formica, and Teflon to achieve smooth operation. Many derivative mount designs have kept this basic form while heavily modifying the materials and configuration.

==== Compact "rocker box" mounts ====
Many designs have increased portability by shrinking the altazimuth (rocker box) mount down to a small rotating platform. The altitude trunnion style bearing in these designs becomes a large radius roughly equal to or greater than the radius of the objective mirror, attached to or integrated into the tube assembly which lowers the overall profile of the mount. The advantage of this is that it reduces the total telescope weight, and the telescope's balance becomes less sensitive to changes in the weight loading of telescope tube from the use of heavier eyepieces or the addition of cameras etc.

==== Overcoming the limitations of the altazimuth mount ====
Since the late 1990s many innovations in mount design and electronics by amateur telescope makers and commercial manufacturers have allowed users to overcome some of the limitations of the Dobsonian style altazimuth mount.

- Digital setting circles: The invention of microprocessor-based digital setting circles (one of the earliest inventors being amateur astronomers and brothers David J. Guerra and John M. Guerra) has allowed any altazimuth mounted telescope to be fitted or retrofitted with the ability to accurately display the coordinates of the telescope direction. These systems not only give the user a digital read-out for right ascension (RA) and declination (dec.), they also interface with digital devices such as laptop computers, tablet computers, and smartphones using live ephemeris calculating / charting planetarium software to give a current graphical representation of where the telescope is pointing, allowing the user to quickly find an object.
- Equatorial platform: The use of equatorial platforms (such as the Poncet Platform) fitted under the altazimuth mount has given users limited equatorial tracking for visual and astrophotographic work. Such platforms can incorporate a clock drive for ease of tracking, and with careful polar alignment sub-arc second precision CCD imaging is entirely possible. Roeser Observatory, Luxembourg (MPC observatory code 163) have contributed hundreds of astrometric measurements to the Minor Planet Center using a home-built 20" dobsonian on an equatorial platform.

== Commercial adaptations ==
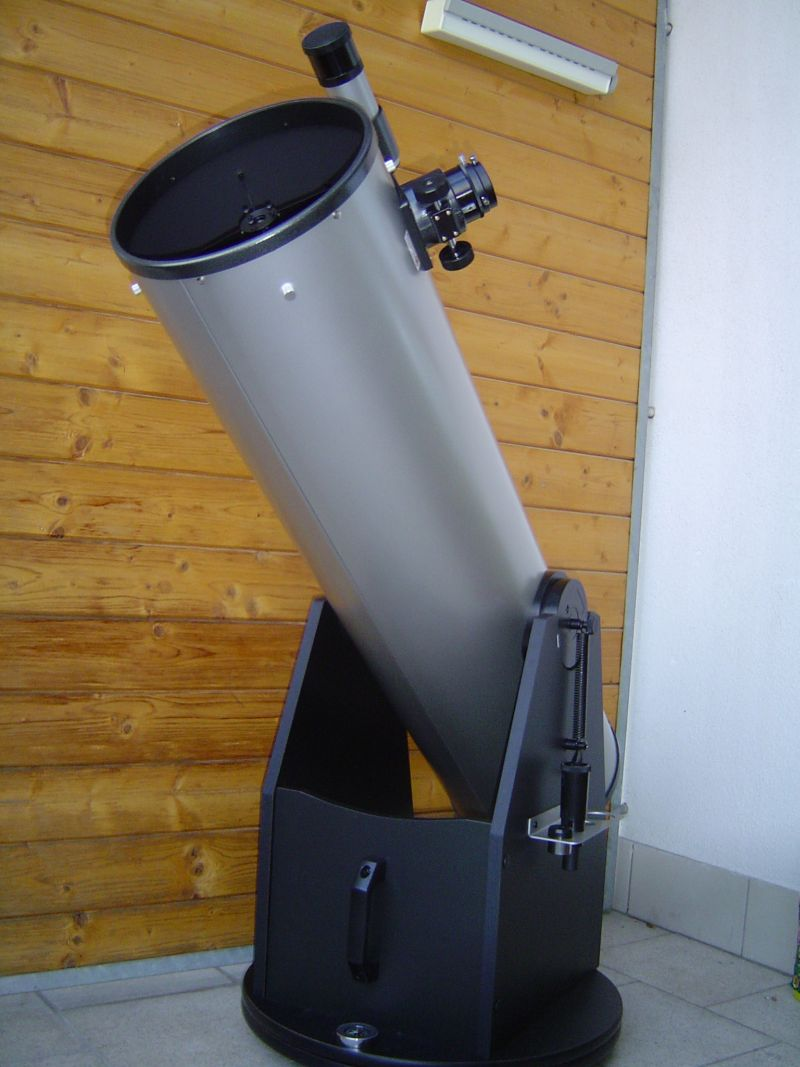
Commercially mass-produced 10" Dobsonian

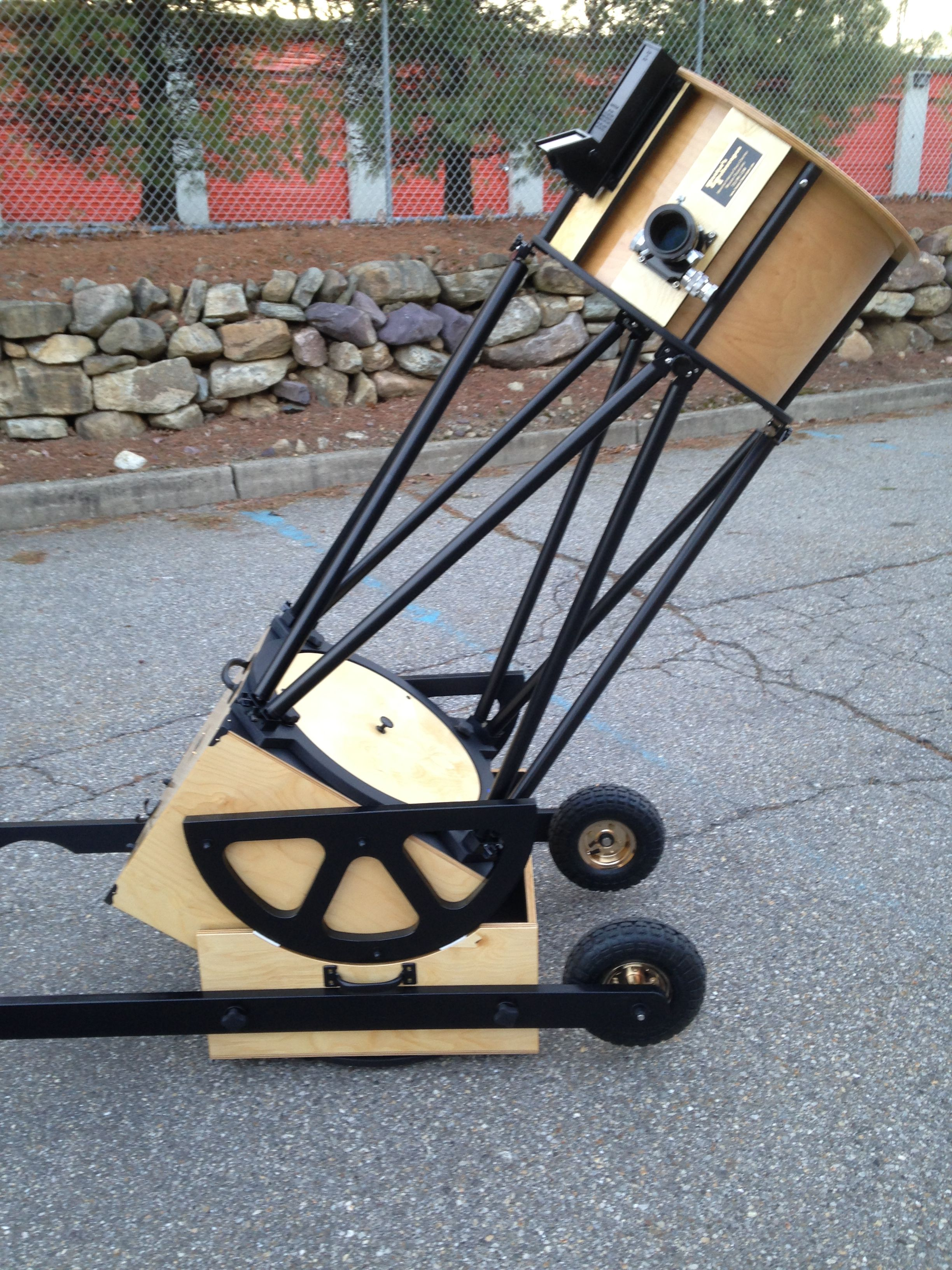
Commercially custom-built 16" truss Dobsonian

The original intent of the Dobsonian design was to provide an affordable, simple, and rugged large-aperture instrument at low cost. These same attributes facilitate their mass production. One of the first companies to offer Dobsonian telescopes commercially was the now defunct company Coulter Optical (now part of Murnaghan Instruments). In the 1980s, they helped popularize the design with "Odyssey" models of various sizes, with tubes made of Sonotube and following Dobson's original concept of simplicity. By the 1990s, Meade Instruments, Orion Telescopes and other manufacturers began to introduce upgraded Dobsonian models. These imported mass-produced scopes included such niceties as metal tubes and more refined hardware, and are still very affordable.

Since the 1990s, manufactured Dobsonians using the truss tube design have become increasingly popular. The first commercial truss Dobsonian was released into the market by Obsession Telescopes in 1989. Later American manufacturers included StarStructure, Webster Telescopes, AstroSystems, Teeter's Telescopes, Hubble Optics, Waite Research, and New Moon Telescopes. These low-volume builders offer premium objective mirrors, high-end materials and custom craftmanship, as well as optional computer controlled GoTo systems. Some also produce "ultra-light" models that offer greater portability.

In the 21st century, truss Dobsonian models are also mass-produced by Meade, Orion, Explore Scientific and others. Mostly manufactured in China; they offer good quality and value while being considerably less expensive than the premium scopes described above. In 2017, Sky-Watcher introduced its line of large Stargate models.

Solid tube commercial Dobsonians typically have a maximum aperture of 12 inches (305 mm) due to the size of the tube. Truss Dobsonians of 12 to 18 inches (305 to 457 mm) are the most popular sizes, as they offer substantial aperture yet can still be easily set up by one person. Several manufacturers offer models of 24 inch (610 mm) aperture and greater. Truss Dobsonians are the largest telescopes commercially available today. A massive 36 inch (914 mm) aperture Hybrid model from New Moon Telescopes was displayed at the 2018 Northeast Astronomy Forum. In 2019, a huge 50 inch (1270 mm) aperture folded Newtonian from Canadian-based Optiques Fullum was installed in New Jersey.

== The Dobsonian's effect on amateur astronomy ==
The Dobsonian design is considered revolutionary due to the sheer size of telescopes it made available to amateur astronomers. The inherent simplicity and large aperture of the design began to attract interest through the 1970s since it offered the advantage of inexpensive large instruments that could be carried to dark sky locations and star parties in the back of a small car and set up in minutes.

The result has been a proliferation of larger telescopes which would have been expensive to build or buy, and unwieldy to operate, using "traditional" construction methods. Whereas an 8-inch Newtonian telescope would have been considered large in the 1970s, today 16 inch systems are common, and huge 32 inch systems not all that rare.

In combination with other improvements in observing equipment, such as narrow-pass optical filters, improved eyepieces, and digital visible and infrared photography, the large apertures of the Dobsonian have dramatically increased the number of objects observed as well as the amount of detail in each object observed. Whereas the amateur astronomer of the 1970s and 1980s typically did not explore much beyond the Messier and brighter NGC objects, thanks in part to Dobsonians, modern amateur astronomers routinely observe dim objects listed in obscure catalogues, such as the IC, Abell, Kohoutek, Minkowski, and others once considered reference works only for professional astronomers.

When mounted on an equatorial platform the difficulties using a Dobsonian for short-exposure (≲ 1 hr) astrophotography are obviated. This has opened up the field of high precision asteroid astrometry (and discovery) to the amateur wishing to contribute minor planet positions to the Minor Planet Center. It also makes possible searches for new, faint objects such as novae/supernovae in local galaxies, and comets (for reports to the Central Bureau for Astronomical Telegrams).

== See also ==
- List of telescope types
