= Mirror cell =

Mirror cell may refer to:

- Mirror neuron, a specialized brain neuron
- Mirror support cell, a component in reflecting telescopes
- Mirror life organisms, a hypothetical form of life based on mirror-image molecular building blocks
