= Altitude-azimuth =

Altitude-azimuth, alt-azimuth, or alt-az may refer to:

- Horizontal coordinate system, or altitude-azimuth coordinates
- Altazimuth mount, a two-axis telescope mount
