= Equatorial platform =

Platform that allows telescopes to track objects in the equatorial axis

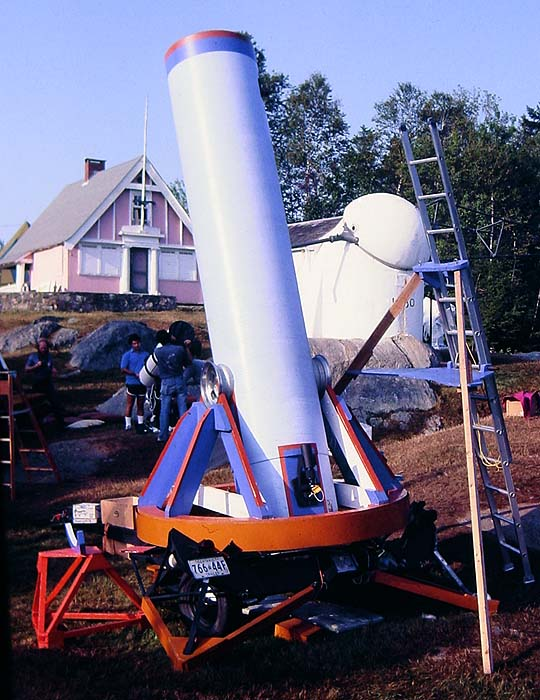
A large portable Newtonian telescope on an altazimuth mount with a third equatorial axis platform mount consisting of a pivot and radius bearing surfaces.

An equatorial platform or equatorial table is an equatorial telescope mount in the form of a specially designed platform that allows any device sitting on it to track astronomical objects in the sky on an equatorial axis. They are used to give equatorial tracking to any device sitting on them, from small cameras up to entire observatory buildings. They are often used with altazimuth mounted telescopes, such as the common Dobsonian telescope type, to overcome that type of mount's inability to track the night sky. With careful polar alignment sub-arc second precision CCD imaging is entirely possible. Roeser Observatory, Luxembourg (MPC observatory code 163) have contributed hundreds of astrometric measurements of Near Earth Asteroids to the Minor Planet Center using a home-built 20" Dobsonian telescope on an Osypowski equatorial platform.

== Types ==
Many types of equatorial platform have been used over the years. The mid-1960s saw the introduction of the Russian AFU-75 satellite-tracking camera which consisted of a 3-axis altitude-altitude-azimuth mount mounted on a three-point equatorial platform. Two of the points were aligned on a polar axis while the third was a jackscrew actuator to drive the platform. This gave the mount a few minutes of equatorial tracking to allow stars in the field of view to be imaged as points for accurate measurement.

=== Poncet Platform ===
A Poncet Platform or Poncet mount is a type of equatorial platform (a telescope mount that adds an additional polar axis to non-equatorial mounts) that uses a simple polar pivot and an inclined plane. It is a very simple design for amateur telescope makers that uses a pivot point and an inclined plane that made a very low profile "table". This type of mount has been a popular retrofit for altazimuth mounted telescopes, such as the common Dobsonian telescope type, adding equatorial tracking for high magnification work and astrophotography.

The motion of the mount allows any device sitting on that platform to track the apparent motion of the stars in the night sky (diurnal motion). It is a highly suitable complement to Dobsonian telescope style altazimuth mounted telescopes in that it follows the design's philosophy of being easy to build using common materials without the need for specialized tools or machined parts. Poncet-based platforms are usually designed to track for 1 hour (15° of tilt) since longer tracking exceeds their range of motion, and could cause the instrument on top to topple off. At the end of its drive limit, the mount has to be pivoted back to the east to reset the clock drive mechanism.

The Poncet Platform was invented in the 1970s by Adrien Poncet. Poncet's original design was a very simple type of equatorial platform that uses pivot as one support and an inclined plane in line with the Earth's equator, along which two other support slides. It was publicized in the January 1977 issue of Sky & Telescope magazine. The model Poncet demonstrated was very simple plywood construction, using a nail pivot and a Formica covered inclined plane with plastic 35 mm film canisters as the platforms bearing feet, on which he mounted a 6" newtonian telescope. The mount in its basic form is very simple, requiring just hand tools and common materials to build, with the only precise calculation being setting the angle of the inclined plane to match the angle of the Celestial equator. It has been used to add equatorial tracking to everything from small cameras to entire observatory buildings. Its simple design and low profile has made it a useful "retrofit" for altazimuth mounted telescopes such as the popular Dobsonian telescope. Users simply place their telescope on top of it to get the added feature of tracking in the direction of right ascension accurate enough for work at higher magnification or astrophotography.

Since the Poncet Platform's simple bearing surfaces suffer from high mechanical loadings when used with heavy telescopes or at low geographic latitudes, more sophisticated equatorial platform designs were invented in the 1980s. One was Alan Gee's design that uses a cylindrical bearing surface and a pivot, making a mount similar in structure to a horseshoe mount that has been "cut flat". In 1988 Georges D'Autume proposed a more sophisticated design which used conical bearing surfaces all around to raise the height of the "virtual polar axis" to make the mount better balanced for heavier loads.

Poncet Platforms do have design limitations. They are usually designed to track for 1 hour (15° of tilt) since longer tracking could cause the instrument on top of it to topple off. After that hour the mount has to be pivoted back to the east to reset the clock drive mechanism. Since the Poncet platform has no roller bearing surfaces that can be driven, the clock drive mechanism itself has posed some design difficulty for telescope makers. Straight line drives such as threaded nut/bolt drives change drive rate when converted to a circular motion. It is also time-consuming to reset via spinning the nut back to the starting point. Amateurs have tackled this by employing curved bolt designs and even using specially shaped cams to convert the straight line motion to a variable speed motion. High mechanical loadings from heavy telescopes or using them at low geographic latitudes can cause the mount to bind up, requiring more complicated improved bearing surfaces to overcome this. This has led to equatorial platform variations based on the Poncet design including Alan Gee's platform mount using a more complicated cylindrical bearing surface in place of the inclined plane, and Georges D'Autume's platform design which uses a sophisticated conical bearing system.

== See also ==
- List of telescope parts and construction
- List of telescope types
