= PLate OPtimizer =

PLate OPtimizer, or PLOP is a CAD program used by amateur telescope makers to design primary mirror support cells for reflecting telescopes. It was developed by telescope maker David Lewis, first described in 1999, and used to simplify calculations needed in the design of mirror support cells. It was based on Toshimi Taki's 1993 program PLATE, with a simplified user interface, thus giving it wide acceptance among makers of large Dobsonian style amateur telescopes, with good support for mirrors as thin as two inches for a diameter of thirty inches.

== Comparisons and limitations ==
A basic mirror cell may be built using minimal calculation and simple materials such as wood and outdoor carpet, with a good example being Dobson's original telescopes. However, as amateurs sought to build larger and thinner mirrors, they found such designs inadequate.

Many amateur telescope makers use cells which are designed via equal area rule calculation, using programs such as David Chandler's public domain program, Cell. However, such calculation does not account for mechanical stresses introduced in one part of a telescope mirror by another part, whereas finite element analysis can be used to reduce such stress. Although general finite element analysis programs such as Nastran will work for mirror cells, an advantage of PLOP is that it can be set to ignore deformation that merely results in refocus of a mirror's parabola. PLOP can be used to calculate floating support points for a mirror's axial (rear) support; however, additional tools are needed to calculate potential error from a mirror's lateral (edge) support.

Mirror cell calculations, whether using PLOP or another program, do not overcome errors introduced by gluing the mirror to its cell, excessive tightening of edge supports, nor impingement of the cell structure onto the mirror as a result of differential cooling shrinkage. The significantly more complex calculations arising from the support needs of large honeycomb mirrors and those using active optics systems are outside the design parameters of such programs.

== See also ==
- Amateur astronomy
- Amateur telescope making
- List of telescope parts and construction
- MATLAB
- Nastran
- Optical aberration
- Optical telescope
- Whiffletree

== External resources ==
- A Study of 18-point Mirror Cell Optimization Using Varying Forces Jeff Anderson-Lee, January 2003
- David Lewis, Automated Mirror Cell Optimization
- Mechanical design of the 110 cm cruxis telescope
- Stellafane links page
