= Parallactic angle =

Measurement in spherical astronomy

In spherical astronomy, the parallactic angle is the angle between the great circle through a celestial object and the zenith, and the hour circle of the object. It is usually denoted q. In the triangle zenith—object—celestial pole, the parallactic angle will be the position angle of the zenith at the celestial object. Despite its name, this angle is unrelated with parallax. The parallactic angle is 0° or 180° when the object crosses the meridian.

== Uses ==
For ground-based observatories, the Earth atmosphere acts like a prism which disperses light of different wavelengths such that a star generates a rainbow along the direction that points to the zenith. So given an astronomical picture with a coordinate system with a known direction to the Celestial pole, the parallactic angle represents the direction of that prismatic effect relative to that reference direction. [In that sense, the stretched image of the star caused by atmospheric dispersion is vaguely similar to the (apparent) motion of the star that could have been produced by its finite distance to the observer, i.e., its parallax.] Knowledge of that angle is needed to align Atmospheric Dispersion Correctors with the beam axis of the telescope.

Depending on the type of mount of the telescope, this angle may also affect the orientation of the celestial object's disk as seen in a telescope. With an equatorial mount, the cardinal points of the celestial object's disk are aligned with the vertical and horizontal direction of the view in the telescope. With an altazimuth mount, those directions are rotated by the amount of the parallactic angle. The cardinal points referred to here are the points on the limb located such that a line from the center of the disk through them will point to one of the celestial poles or 90° away from them; these are not the cardinal points defined by the object's axis of rotation.

The orientation of the disk of the Moon, as related to the horizon, changes throughout its diurnal motion and the parallactic angle changes equivalently. This is also the case with other celestial objects.

In an ephemeris, the position angle of the midpoint of the bright limb of the Moon or planets, and the position angles of their North poles may be tabulated. If this angle is measured from the North point on the limb, it can be converted to an angle measured from the zenith point (the vertex) as seen by an observer by subtracting the parallactic angle. The position angle of the bright limb is directly related to that of the subsolar point.

The parallactic angle appears in the summation of areas of spherical polygons which are represented by lists of latitude-longitude angles, the generalization of Girard's theorem.

== Derivation ==
=== By spherical trigonometry ===
Diagram showing the spherical triangle PZS

Take the celestial sphere as in the diagram, with the observer at the centre, the zenith at Z, the north celestial pole at P and the star or other object of interest at S. N is on the horizon in the north, and H is on the horizon below S. Then in the spherical triangle PZS, the parallactic angle q is the internal angle at S.

PZ is the complementary angle of the latitude, $90^\circ - \varphi$ where $\varphi$ is latitude.

PS is the distance from S to the north celestial pole, $90^\circ - \delta$ where $\delta$ is the declination.

ZS is the zenith distance, $90^\circ - a$ where $a$ is the altitude.

The interior angle at P is the hour angle $h$.

Then, applying the spherical law of sines, and using $\cos \theta = \sin(90^\circ - \theta)$, we have

$$\frac{\cos \varphi}{\sin q} = \frac{\cos a}{\sin h}$$

And applying the spherical law of cosines:

$$\sin \varphi = \sin a \sin \delta + \cos a \cos \delta \cos q$$

$$\sin a = \sin \varphi \sin \delta + \cos \varphi \cos \delta \cos h$$

By solving these equations for $\sin q$ and $\cos q$ and using $\tan q = \sin q\ / \cos q$ we obtain the formula recommended by Meeus:

$$\tan q = \frac{\sin h}{\cos \delta \tan \varphi - \sin \delta \cos h}$$

=== By vector algebra ===
The vector algebra to derive the standard formula is equivalent to the calculation of the long derivation for the compass course. The sign of the angle is basically kept, north over east in both cases, but as astronomers look at stars from the inside of the celestial sphere, the definition uses the convention that the q is the angle in an image that turns the direction to the NCP counterclockwise into the direction of the zenith.

In the equatorial system of right ascension, α, and declination, δ, the star is at

$$\mathbf{s} = \left(\begin{array}{c} \cos\delta \cos \alpha \\
\cos \delta\sin\alpha\\
\sin\delta\end{array}
\right).$$

The North Celestial Pole is at

$$\mathbf{N} = \left(\begin{array}{c}0 \\ 0 \\ 1 \end{array}\right).$$

In this same coordinate system the zenith is found by inserting altitude, a=π/2, cos a=0, into the transformation formulas to get

$$\mathbf{z} = \left(\begin{array}{c} \cos\varphi \cos l\\
\cos\varphi \sin l\\
\sin\varphi\end{array}
\right),$$

where φ is the observer's geographic latitude, and l the local sidereal time.

This also describes a rotating, right-handed, observer coordinate frame, with X-axis aligned to the south, where the local meridian intersects the horizon, Y-axis toward the eastern horizon, and Z-axis toward the zenith. This is the coordinate frame in which altitude and azimuth are measured. For the star, at some moment, l, with expected altitude, a, define its zenith distance as $z = \pi/2-a$. Its hour-angle, $h = l - \alpha$, measures the elapsed sidereal time interval since the star crossed the local Meridian and is negative if the star is east of the meridian and its crossing is pending.

The normalized cross product is the rotation axis that turns the star into the direction of the zenith:

$$\mathbf{\omega}_z = \frac{1}{\sin z}\mathbf{s}\times \mathbf{z}
= \frac{1}{\sin z}\left(\begin{array}{c} \cos\delta\sin\alpha\sin\varphi -\sin\delta\cos\varphi\sin l\\
-\cos\delta\cos\alpha\sin\varphi +\sin\delta \cos\varphi\cos l\\
\cos\delta \cos\varphi \sin(\alpha-l) \end{array}
\right).$$

Finally ω_{z}×s is the third axis of the tilted coordinate system and the direction into which the star is moved on the great circle towards the zenith.

The plane tangential to the celestial sphere at the star is spanned by the unit vectors to the north,

$$\mathbf{u}_\delta = \left(\begin{array}{c} -\sin\delta\cos\alpha\\
-\sin\delta\sin\alpha\\
\cos\delta \end{array}\right),$$

and to the east

$$\mathbf{u}_\alpha = \left(\begin{array}{c} -\sin\alpha \\
\cos\alpha\\
0 \end{array}\right).$$

These are orthogonal:

$$\mathbf{u}_\delta \cdot \mathbf{u}_\alpha=0;\quad
\mathbf{u}^2_\delta = \mathbf{u}^2_\alpha=1.$$

The parallactic angle q is the angle of the initial section of the great circle at s, east of north,

$$\omega_z\times \mathbf{s} = \cos q\, \mathbf{u}_\delta + \sin q \, \mathbf{u}_\alpha.$$
$$\cos q = (\omega_z\times \mathbf{s})\cdot \mathbf{u}_\delta =
\frac{1}{\sin z}(\cos\delta\sin\varphi -\sin\delta \cos\varphi \cos h),$$
$$\sin q = (\omega_z\times \mathbf{s})\cdot \mathbf{u}_\alpha =
\frac{1}{\sin z}\sin h \cos\varphi.$$

(The previous formula is the sine formula of spherical trigonometry.) The values of sin z and of cos φ are positive, so using atan2 functions one may divide both expressions through these without losing signs; eventually

$$\tan q = \frac{\sin h\cos\varphi}{\cos\delta \sin\varphi -\sin\delta \cos\varphi \cos h}=
\frac{\sin h}{\cos\delta \tan\varphi-\sin\delta \cos h}$$

yields the angle in the full range -π ≤ q ≤ π. The advantage of this expression is that it does not depend on the various offset conventions of azimuth, A; the uncontroversial offset of the hour angle, h, takes care of this.

=== Time derivatives ===
For a sidereal target, by definition a target where δ and α are not time-dependent, the angle changes with a period of a sidereal day T_{s}. Let dots denote time derivatives; then the hour angle changes as

$$\dot h =\frac{2\pi}{T_s}$$

and the time derivative of the tan q expression is

$$\dot q \frac{1}{\cos^2 q}= \frac{\cos\varphi[\cos h \cos\delta \sin\varphi-\sin\delta\cos\varphi]}{(\cos\delta \sin\varphi-\sin\delta \cos\varphi \cos h)^2} \dot h;$$
$$\dot q
= \frac{\cos \varphi[\cos h \cos\delta \sin \varphi -\sin \delta \cos\varphi]}{\sin ^2z}\dot h
= \frac{\cos \varphi \cos a \cos A}{\sin^2 z}\dot h
=\frac{\cos\varphi \cos A}{\sin z}\dot h.$$

The value derived above always refers to the north celestial pole as the origin of coordinates even if it is not visible (i.e., if the telescope is south of the equator). Some authors introduce more complicated formulas with variable signs to derive similar angles for telescopes south of the equator that use the south celestial pole as the reference.

== See also ==
- Libration
- Equatorial mount
- Altazimuth mount
