= Star hopping =

Star hopping is a technique that amateur astronomers often use to locate astronomical objects in the night sky. It can be used instead of or in addition to setting circles or go-to/push-to systems.

== The problem ==
Many celestial objects of interest are too faint to be visible to the unaided eye. Telescopes or binoculars collect much more light, making faint objects visible, but have a smaller field of view, thus complicating orientation on the sky.

The field of view of binoculars is rarely more than eight degrees, while that of typical amateur telescopes may be substantially less than one degree, depending on the magnification used. Many objects are best observed using higher magnifications, which inevitably go along with narrow fields of view.

== The technique ==
Star hopping uses bright stars as a guide to finding fainter objects. A knowledge of the relative positions of bright stars and target objects is essential. After planning the star hop with the aid of a star chart, the observer first locates one or more bright stars in a finderscope, reflex sight, or, at a low magnification, with the instrument to be used for observation. The instrument is then moved by one or more increments, possibly using a reticle to identify specific angular distances, to follow identified patterns of stars in the sky (known as asterisms), until the target object is reached.

Using a telescope equipped with a properly aligned equatorial mount, the observer may also follow the equatorial coordinate system on a star map to move along the lines of right ascension or declination from a well known object to find a target. This can be assisted using setting circles.

Once an instrument is centered on the target object, higher magnifications may be used for observation.

== Example ==
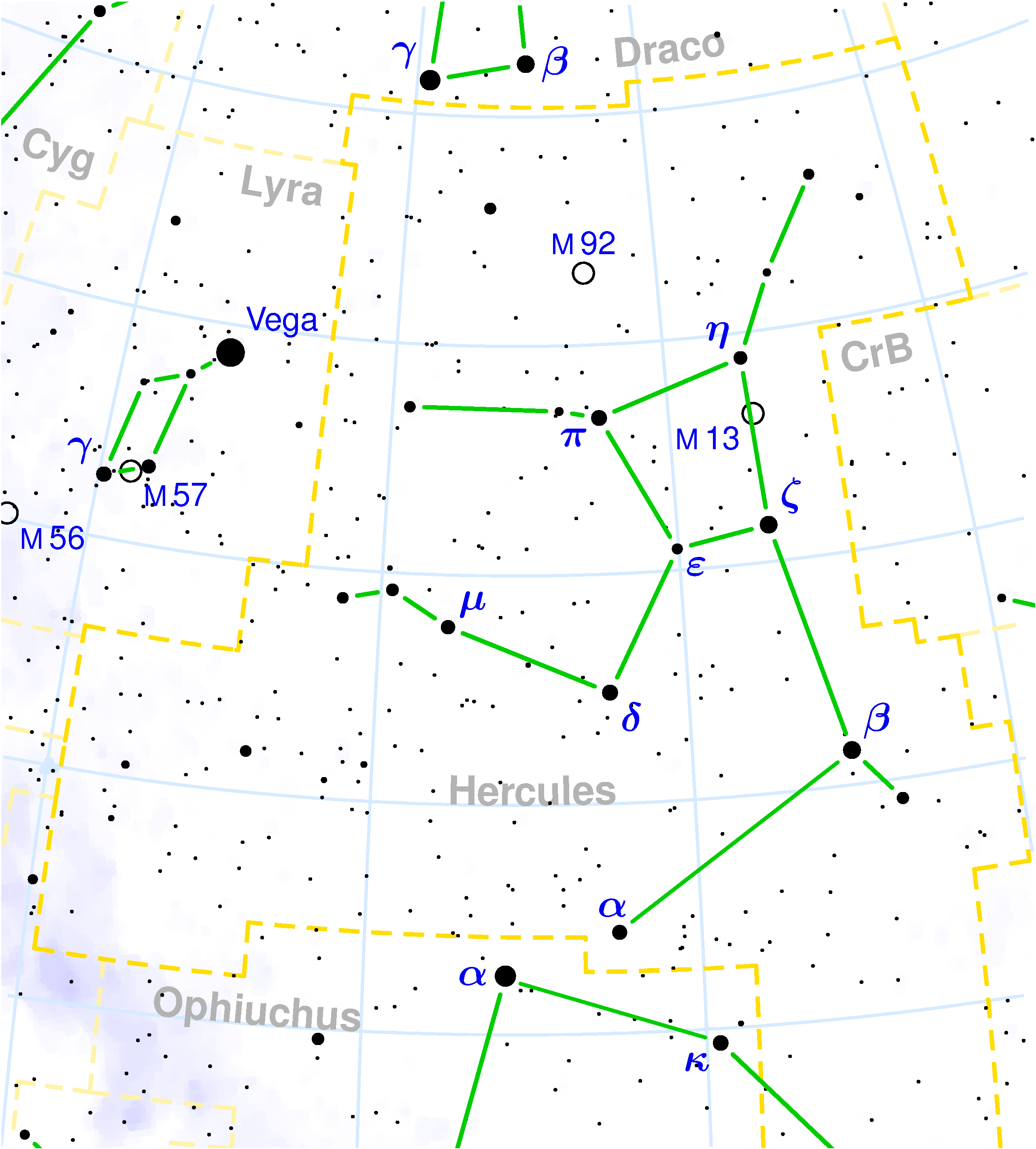
Star chart showing the constellation Hercules

A simple example of star hopping would be finding Messier 13 (M13), a globular cluster in the constellation Hercules, which is too faint to be seen by the unaided eye under most conditions. As shown on the star chart, M13 lies on a line connecting the stars ζ Herculis and η Herculis. Using star hopping techniques an observer would first identify these two by the naked eye and then point an instrument (binocular or telescope) two thirds of the way up from ζ, one third down from η to see M13. An observer using a telescope equipped with an equatorial mount would pan down from η in declination to site M13.
