= Tpoint =

TPoint is computer software that implements a mathematical model of conditions leading to errors in telescope pointing and tracking. The model can then be used in a telescope control system to correct the pointing and tracking. Such errors are typically caused by mechanical or structural defects. For example, TPoint can analyze and compensate for systematic errors such as polar misalignment, mechanical and optical non-orthogonality, lack of roundness in telescope mounting drive gears, as well as for flexure of the mounting caused by gravity.

TPoint is in use on the majority of professional telescopes worldwide, including among many others the Anglo-Australian Telescope, Keck Observatory, Gemini Observatory and the Large Binocular Telescope. It has significantly improved the performance and efficiency of telescope operation and has had an especially strong impact on the development of automated and robotic telescopes.

TPoint is also widely used by amateur astronomers. Software Bisque distributes TPoint as an add-on to TheSkyX Serious Astronomer Edition and TheSkyX Professional; this version is used to improve the pointing of amateur telescopes.

== History ==
TPoint was invented and developed by Patrick Wallace. It grew out of work he and John Straede performed at the Anglo-Australian Telescope (AAT) between 1974 and 1980 using Interdata 70 computers. In the early 1980s, it was ported to the Digital Equipment Corporation VAX running under the VMS operating system and between 1990 and 1992 was also ported to run on the PC/MS-DOS platform as well as various UNIX platforms. A TPoint add-on is available for TheSkyX Serious Astronomer Edition and TheSkyX Professional Edition from Software Bisque, and it runs under Linux, macOS and Microsoft Windows.
