= Position angle =

Convention for measuring angles on the sky

An illustration of how position angle is estimated through a telescope eyepiece; the primary star of a hypothetical binary star is always considered at center.

In astronomy, position angle (usually abbreviated PA) is the convention for measuring angles on the sky. The International Astronomical Union defines it as the angle measured relative to the north celestial pole (NCP), turning positive into the direction of the right ascension. In the standard (non-flipped) images, this is a counterclockwise measure relative to the axis into the direction of positive declination.

In the case of observed visual binary stars, it is defined as the angular offset of the secondary star from the primary relative to the north celestial pole.

As the example illustrates, if one were observing a hypothetical binary star with a PA of 135°, that means an imaginary line in the eyepiece drawn from the north celestial pole to the primary (P) would be offset from the secondary (S) such that the NCP-P-S angle would be 135°.

When graphing visual binaries, the NCP is, as in the illustration, normally drawn from the center point (origin) that is the Primary downward–that is, with north at bottom–and PA is measured counterclockwise. Also, the direction of the proper motion can, for example, be given by its position angle.

The definition of position angle is also applied to extended objects like galaxies, where it refers to the angle made by the major axis of the object with the line from its center to NCP.

In stellar interferometry with two telescopes, the baseline of the interferometer defines a position angle at the target because the projection of the baseline on the celestial sphere becomes the direction of the angle of high resolution in the point spread function.

== Nautics ==
The concept of the position angle is inherited from nautical navigation on the oceans, where the optimum compass course is the course from a known position s to a target position t with minimum effort. Setting aside the influence of winds and ocean currents, the optimum course is the course of smallest distance between the two positions on the ocean surface. Computing the compass course is known as the inverse geodetic problem.

This article considers only the abstraction of minimizing the distance between s and t traveling on the surface of a sphere with some radius R: In which direction angle p relative to North should the ship steer to reach the target position?

== See also ==
- Parallactic angle
- Angular distance
