= Clock drive =

Mechanism in a telescope's mount

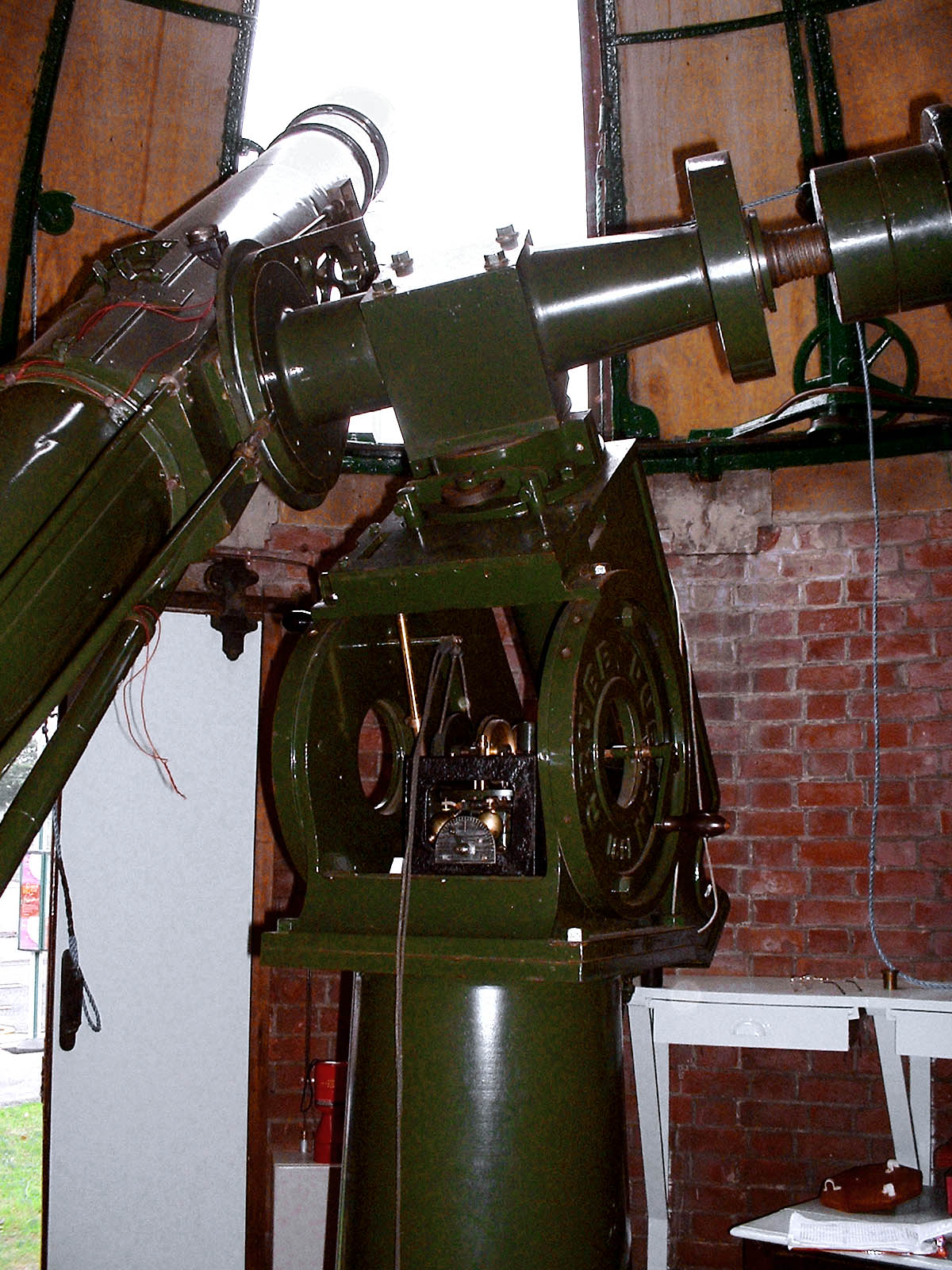
Clock drive mechanism in the pier of the German equatorial mount for the 8-inch refracting telescope at Aldershot Observatory.

In astronomy, a clock drive (also known as a sidereal drive or field rotator) is a motor-controlled mechanism used to move an equatorial mounted telescope along one axis to keep the aim in exact sync with the apparent motion of the fixed stars on the celestial sphere.

== Overview ==
Clock drives work by rotating a telescope mount's polar axis, the axis parallel to the Earth's polar axis (also called the right ascension axis) in the opposite direction to the Earth's rotation one revolution every 23 hours and 56 minutes (called sidereal day), thereby canceling that motion. This allows the telescope to stay fixed on a certain point in the sky without having to be constantly re-aimed due to the Earth's rotation. The mechanism itself used to be clockwork but nowadays is usually electrically driven. Clock drives can be light and portable for smaller telescopes or can be exceedingly heavy and complex for larger ones such as the 60-inch telescope at the Mount Wilson Observatory. Clock-driven equatorial platforms are sometimes used in non-tracking type mounts, such as altazimuth mounts.

== History ==
The original inventor of the clock drive is unknown, being an idea that was tried in several ways throughout history. In China in 1094, during the Song dynasty, Su Song built a water-driven clock tower that had many features, including a 20-ton bronze armillary sphere that stayed in alignment with the heavens.

Different types of equatorial clock-driven telescopes were built or proposed in the 17th and 18th century including English astronomer Robert Hooke's 1674 paper proposing their use in precision measurement, a clock-driven aerial telescope objective lens constructed in 1685 by Italian-French astronomer Giovanni Domenico Cassini fitted with setting circles, and one supposedly built by English clockmaker and inventor George Graham early 18th century.

What is considered the first practical clock-driven telescope was constructed in 1824, Joseph von Fraunhofer's ‘Great Dorpat’ refractor, a telescope that combined other innovations, such as an achromatic lens and Fraunhofer's "German equatorial mount", making it the prototype of all future large refracting telescopes. Early telescope clock drives used a clock work with falling weights and pendulums, almost like grandfather clocks. Over time the falling weights and pendulums were replaced by an electric motor.

== See also ==
- GoTo (telescopes)
- Guide star
- Polar alignment
- Setting circles
