= Serrurier truss =

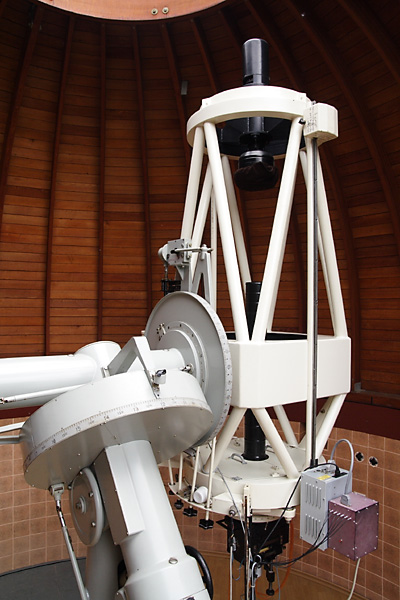
A Serrurier truss tube assembly on the Carl Zeiss Cassegrain telescope in Ostrowik near Warsaw.

A Serrurier truss is used in telescope tube assembly construction. The design was created in 1935 by engineer Mark U. Serrurier when he was working on the Mount Palomar 200 in (5.1 m) Hale Telescope. The design solves the problem of truss flexing when pointed in a direction other than straight up, by supporting the primary objective and the secondary mirrors with two sets of opposing trusses before and after the declination pivot. The trusses are designed to have an equal amount of lateral deflection due to gravity, which allows the optics to stay on a common optical axis, and the optical elements stay in collimation regardless of the orientation of the telescope. The heavier primary mirror is supported by a shorter truss, while the lighter secondary is supported by a longer truss, designed so the resultant deflections are equal.

Principle of operation of a Serrurier truss for a telescope compared to a simple truss. For clarity, only the top and bottom structural elements are shown. Red and green lines denote elements under tension and compression, respectively.

Although not the primary purpose of the design, a Serrurier truss also tends to keep the length (and therefore focus) of the telescope fixed under axial gravity load. When pointing at the zenith (straight up), the upper truss is in compression and shortens slightly, while the lower truss is in tension and lengthens by a similar amount, again because the amount of flex (the weight being supported divided by the stiffness of the support) is equal for the two trusses.

Some Serrurier truss designs hinge the ends of the truss members using short flexible segments near the nodes, creating a more ideal "parallel motion flexure" system, to allow maximum parallelism of optical elements under gravitational load. Since truss members work primarily in tension and compression, there is no appreciable loss of stiffness due to the bending of the end flexures.

Certain single-truss designs used by amateur telescope makers, specifically truss tube Dobsonians, are sometimes incorrectly called "Serrurier truss" designs. These single trusses are used for their rigidity and do keep the optical elements parallel, but since they lack the opposing truss that keeps optics on the same optical axis they are not technically "Serrurier trusses".

Other examples of Serrurier truss designs:

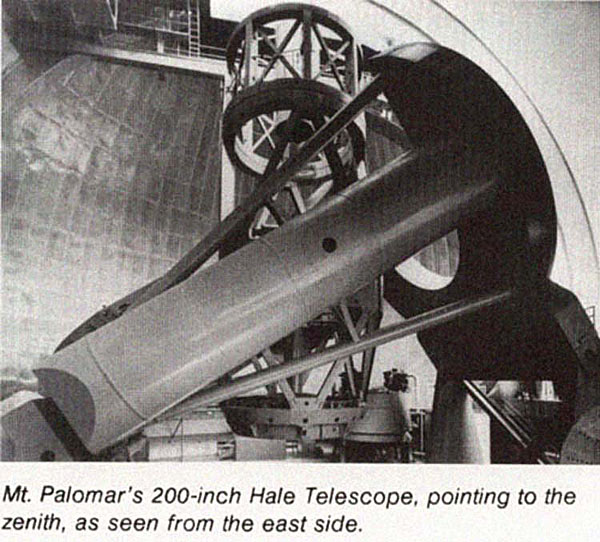
200 in (5.1 m) Hale Telescope

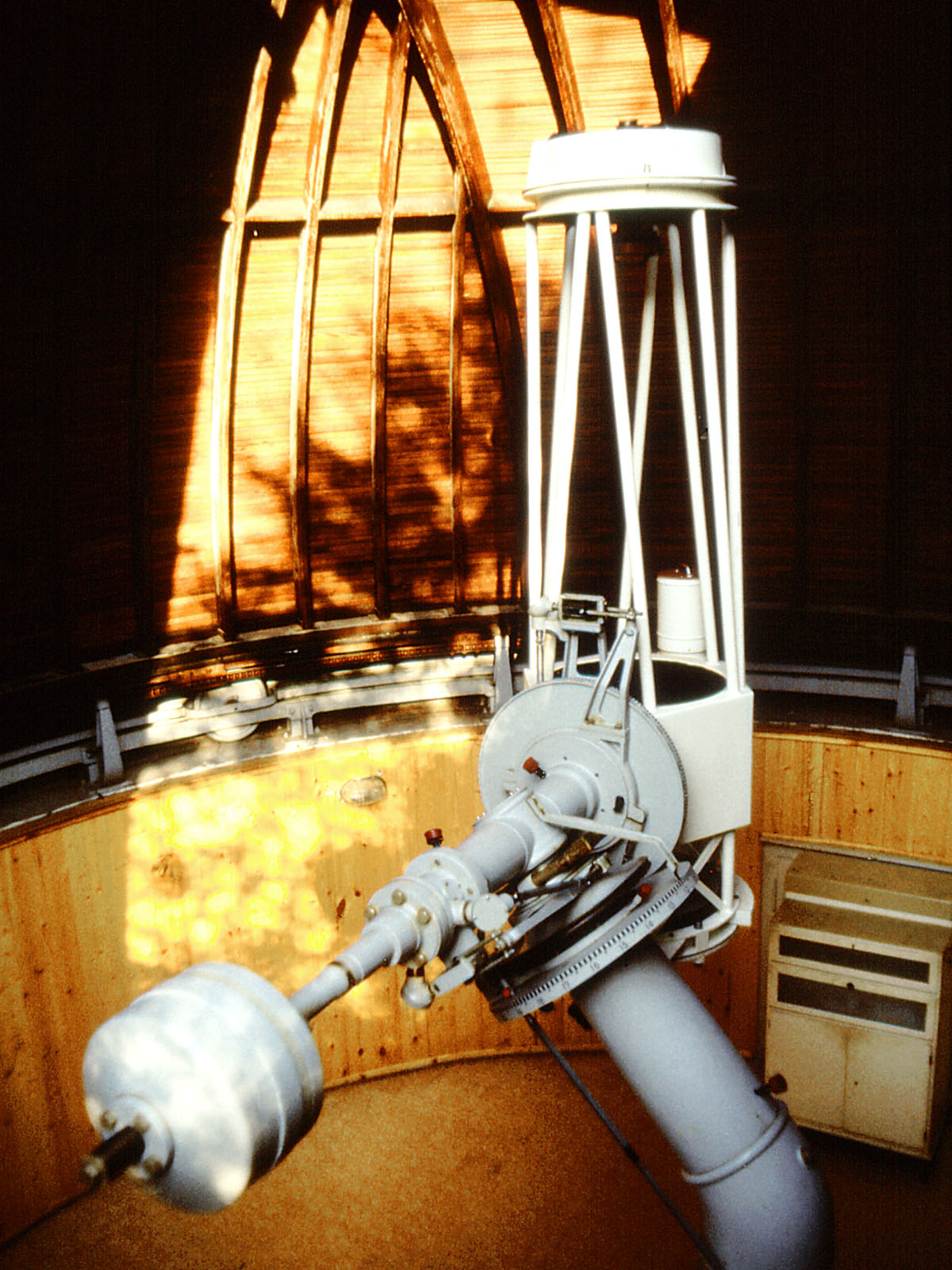
Forststernwarte Jena 50 cm (20 in)

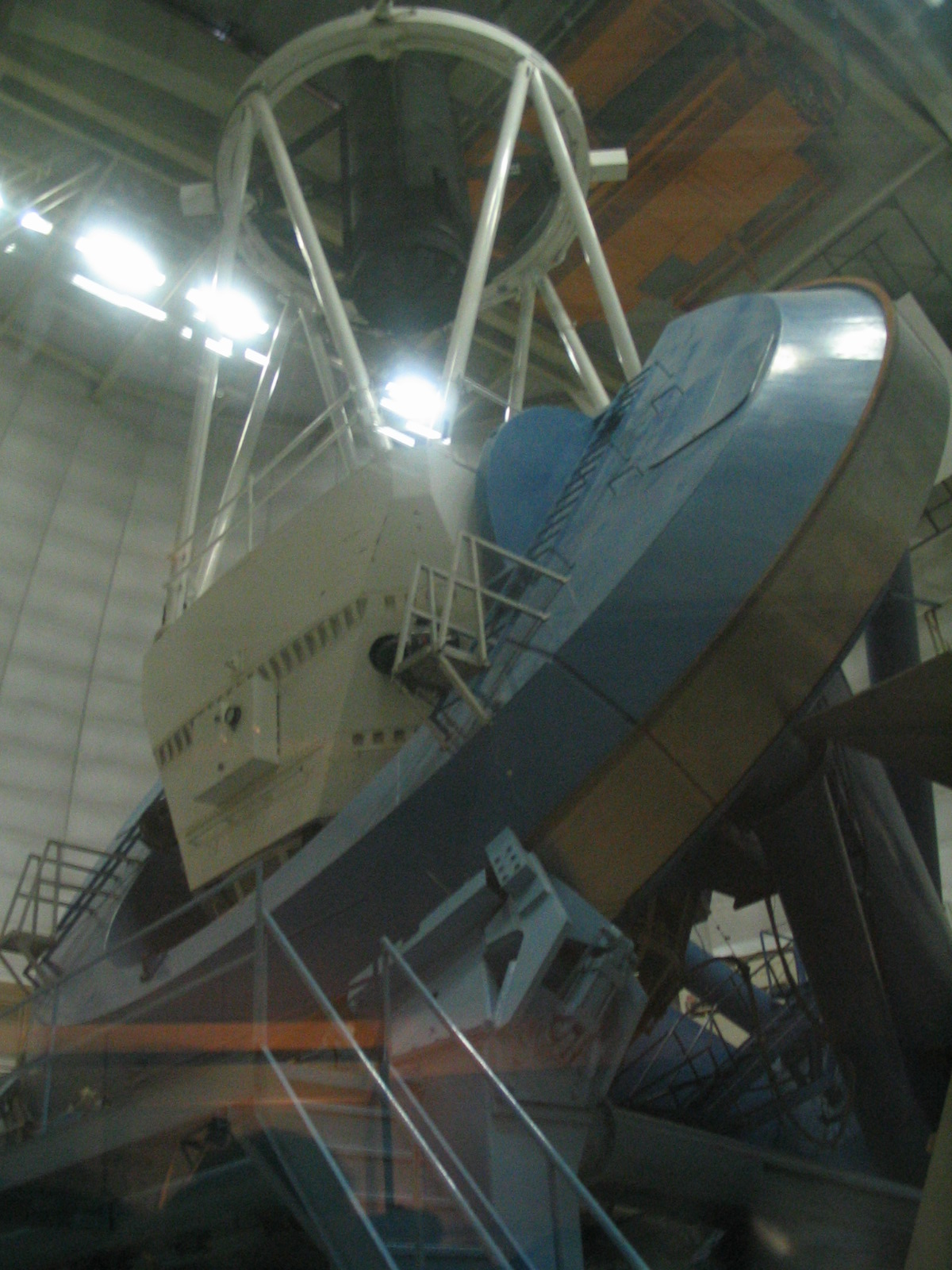
Serrurier truss used on the Mayall Telescope.

Animation of a Serrurier truss under load

Animation of a Serrurier truss under load, slanted view

== See also ==
- List of telescope parts and construction
