= Mirror support cell =

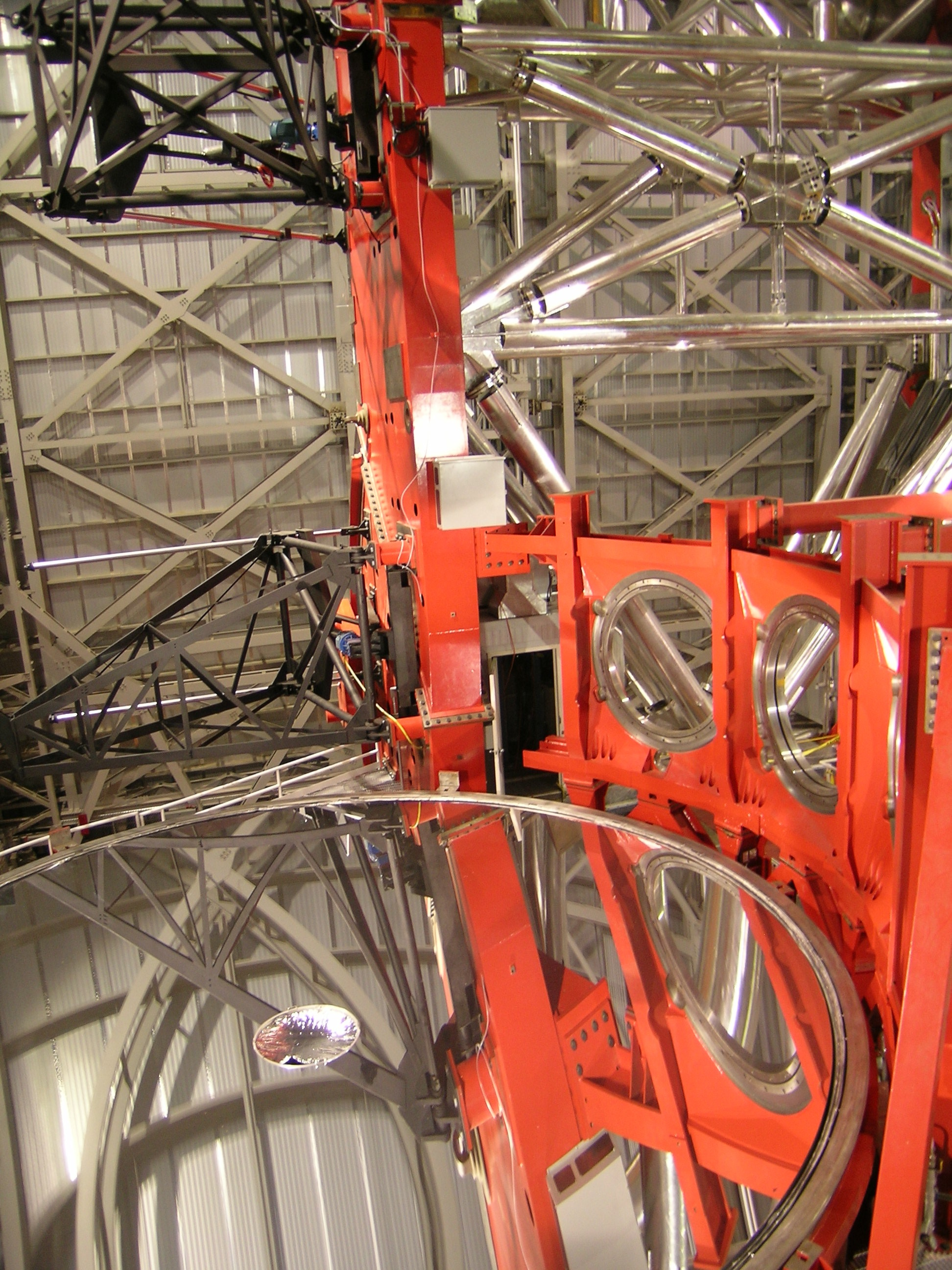
Mirror of the Large Binocular Telescope

In astronomy, a mirror support cell - more commonly mirror cell - is a component of a reflecting telescope that supports the mirror in place to hold optical alignment, allow collimation adjustment, and protect it from falling out. The common usage of the word denotes the cell that holds the primary mirror (M1), however technically it could also be used to denote the support assembly (usually called a spider or strut) for the secondary mirror (M2) or other mirrors.

== Overview ==
=== Basic cells ===
A basic mirror cell can be built using minimal calculation and simple materials. Only slightly more complex are the wooden, plastic or metal cells which are often glued and which are either not user adjustable or which have only limited adjustment and which are used in lower end commercial telescopes and smaller amateur-built telescopes.

=== Cells for more sophisticated "small" telescopes ===
Telescope makers seeking to build larger "small" telescopes with thinner mirrors find simple designs inadequate so they must resort to more complex design methods which include possible use of multiaxis adjustment potential and floating whippletree cell design, often optimimized using computer aided design programs. There remains a good deal of discussion in the amateur telescope making community over the use of glue and the addition of simple astatic devices in such cells.

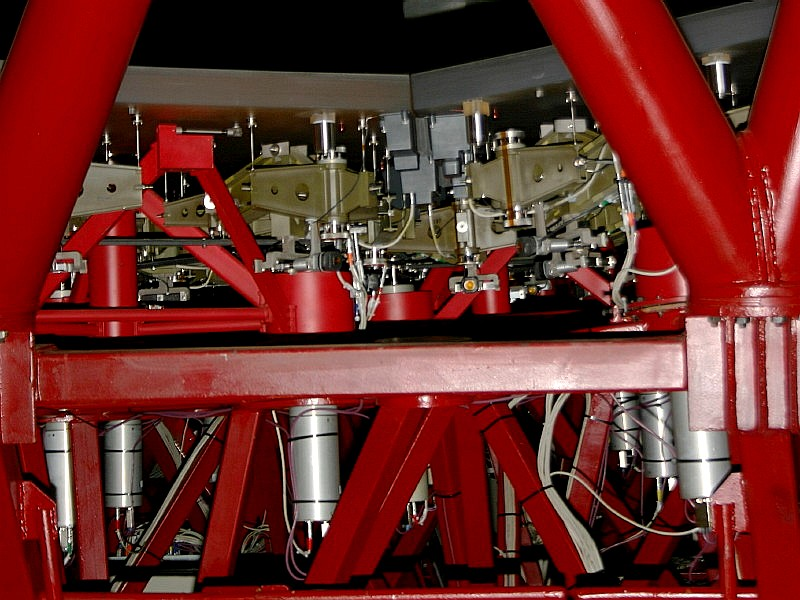
Actuators of the active optics in the mirror support cell of the Gran Telescopio Canarias.

=== Cells for large telescopes ===
Astronomical observatories require a much heavier and more complex mirror support cell. One notable example of the structure needed for such telescopes is the dual cell for the M1 mirrors of the 8.4 meter Large Binocular Telescope at Mount Graham International Observatory. This is a multiple beam and truss system which in turn supports a temperature maintenance and air flow system, six position actuators and the 160 pneumatic actuators which work its active optics system. This results in a huge assembly structure weighing about 28 tons without its mirrors. Such a mirror cell requires multiple mathematical steps of finite element analysis of its deformation under static and moving loading.

== See also ==
- Amateur Telescope Making - book series by Albert G. Ingalls
- Amateur telescope making - the practice of telescope making by non-professionals
- List of telescope parts and construction
- Optical telescope
- PLate OPtimizer
- Telescope mount
- Mirror mount
