= Equatorial mount =

Mounting system for camera or telescope

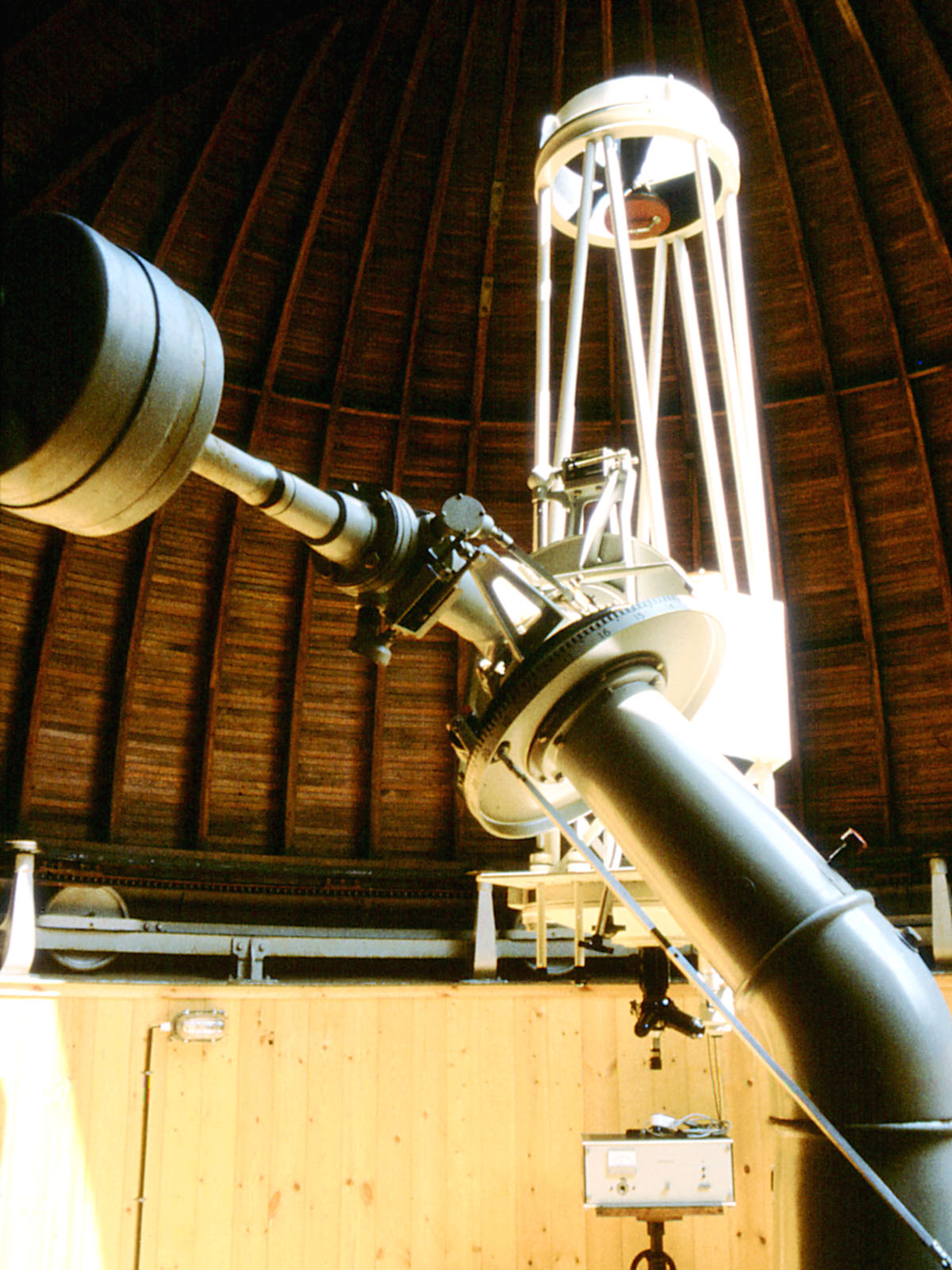
A large German equatorial mount on the Forststernwarte Jena 50cm Cassegrain reflector telescope.

An equatorial mount is a mount for instruments that compensates for Earth's rotation by having one rotational axis, called polar axis, parallel to the Earth's axis of rotation. This type of mount is used for astronomical telescopes and cameras. The advantage of an equatorial mount lies in its ability to allow the instrument attached to it to stay fixed on any celestial object with diurnal motion by driving one axis at a constant speed. Such an arrangement is called a sidereal drive or clock drive. Equatorial mounts achieve this by aligning their rotational axis with the Earth, a process known as polar alignment.

Principle of operation and effect of an equatorial mount, assuming the subject is far enough that parallax is negligible

== Astronomical telescope mounts ==
In astronomical telescope mounts, the equatorial axis (the right ascension) is paired with a second perpendicular axis of motion (known as the declination). The equatorial axis of the mount is often equipped with a motorized "clock drive", that rotates that axis one revolution every 23 hours and 56 minutes in exact sync with the apparent diurnal motion of the sky. They may also be equipped with setting circles to allow for the location of objects by their celestial coordinates. Equatorial mounts differ from mechanically simpler altazimuth mounts, which require variable speed motion around both axes to track a fixed object in the sky. Also, for astrophotography, the image does not rotate in the focal plane, as occurs with altazimuth mounts when they are guided to track the target's motion, unless a rotating erector prism or other field-derotator is installed.

Equatorial telescope mounts come in many designs. In the last twenty years motorized tracking has increasingly been supplemented with computerized object location. There are two main types. Digital setting circles take a small computer with an object database that is attached to encoders. The computer monitors the telescope's position in the sky. The operator must push the telescope. Go-to systems use (in most cases) a worm and ring gear system driven by servo or stepper motors, and the operator need not touch the instrument at all to change its position in the sky. The computers in these systems are typically either hand-held in a control "paddle" or supplied through an adjacent laptop computer which is also used to capture images from an electronic camera. The electronics of modern telescope systems often include a port for autoguiding. A special instrument tracks a star and makes adjustments in the telescope's position while photographing the sky. To do so the autoguider must be able to issue commands through the telescope's control system. These commands can compensate for very slight errors in the tracking performance, such as periodic error caused by the worm drive that makes the telescope move.

In new observatory designs, equatorial mounts have been out of favor for decades in large-scale professional applications. Massive new instruments are most stable when mounted in an alt-azimuth (up down, side-to-side) configuration. Computerized tracking and field-derotation are not difficult to implement at the professional level. At the amateur level, however, equatorial mounts remain popular, particularly for astrophotography.

=== German equatorial mount ===
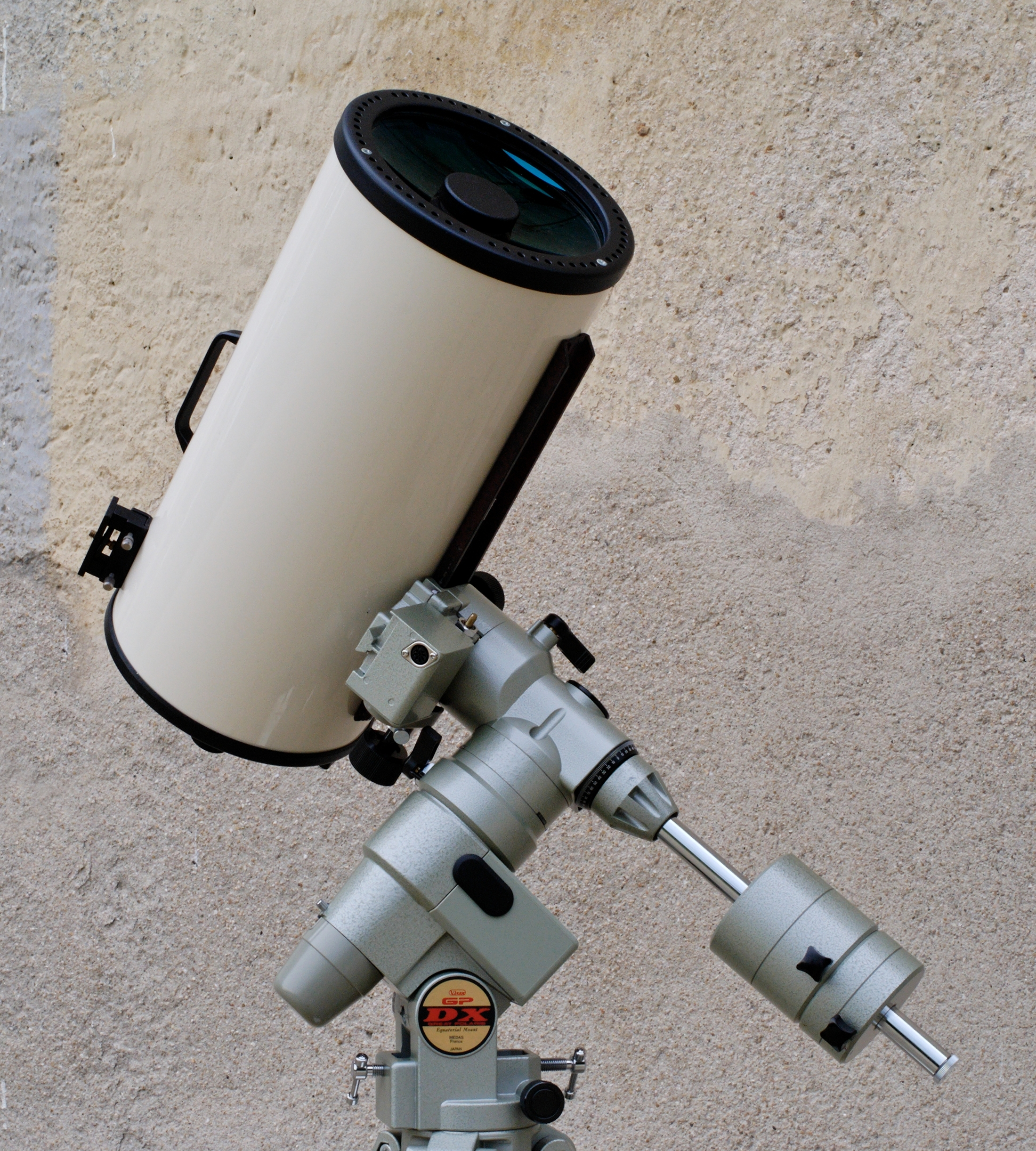
German equatorial mount

In the German equatorial mount, (sometimes called a "GEM" for short) the primary structure is a T-shape, where the lower bar is the right ascension axis (lower diagonal axis in image), and the upper bar is the declination axis (upper diagonal axis in image). The mount was developed by Joseph von Fraunhofer for the Great Dorpat Refractor that was finished in 1824. The telescope is placed on one end of the declination axis (top left in image), and a suitable counterweight on the other end of it (bottom right). The right ascension axis has bearings below the T-joint, that is, it is not supported above the declination axis.

=== Open fork mount ===
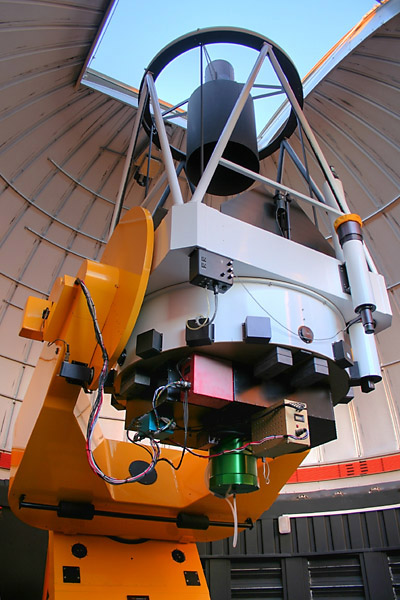
Open fork mount

The Open Fork mount has a Fork attached to a right ascension axis at its base. The telescope is attached to two pivot points at the other end of the fork so it can swing in declination. Most modern mass-produced catadioptric reflecting telescopes (200 mm or larger diameter) tend to be of this type. The mount resembles an Altazimuth mount, but with the azimuth axis tilted and lined up to match earth rotation axis with a piece of hardware usually called a "wedge".

Many mid-size professional telescopes also have equatorial forks, these are usually in range of 0.5-2.0 meter diameter.

=== English or Yoke mount ===
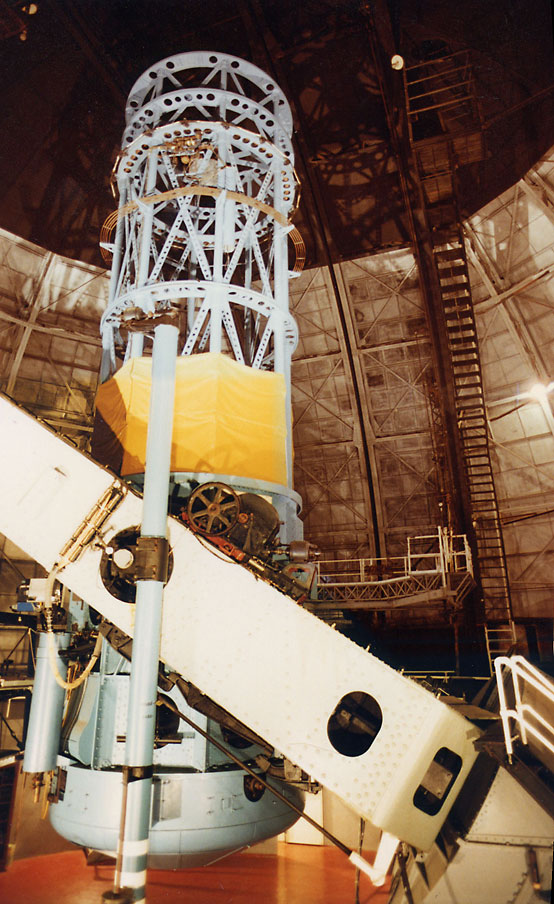
English mount on the Hooker telescope

The English mount or Yoke mount has a frame or "yoke" with right ascension axis bearings at the top and the bottom ends, and a telescope attached inside the midpoint of the yoke allowing it to swing on the declination axis. The telescope is usually fitted entirely inside the fork, although there are exceptions such as the Mount Wilson 2.5 m reflector, and there are no counterweights as with the German mount.

The original English fork design is disadvantaged in that it does not allow the telescope to point too near the north or south celestial pole.

=== Horseshoe mount ===
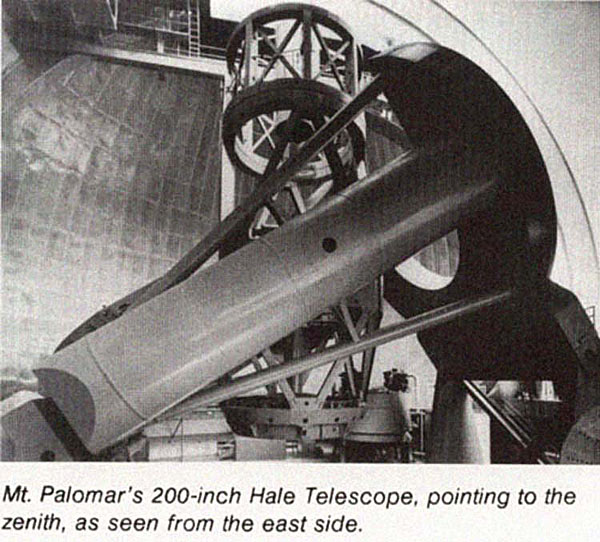
Horseshoe mount on the Hale Telescope

The horseshoe mount overcomes the design disadvantage of English or Yoke mounts by replacing the polar bearing with an open "horseshoe" structure to allow the telescope to access Polaris and stars near it. The Hale Telescope is the most prominent example of a horseshoe mount in use.

=== Cross-axis mount ===
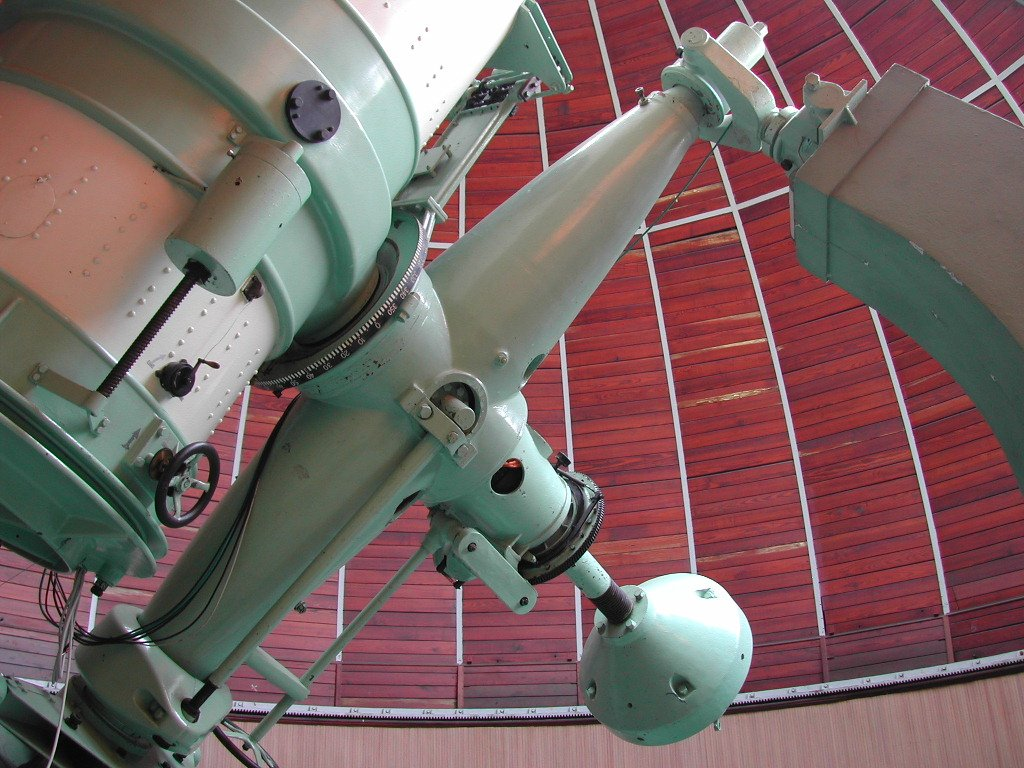
Cross-axis mount.

The Cross-axis or English cross axis mount is like a big "plus" sign (+). The right ascension axis is supported at both ends, and the declination axis is attached to it at approximately midpoint with the telescope on one end of the declination axis and a counter weight on the other.

=== Equatorial platform ===
An equatorial platform is a specially designed platform that allows any device sitting on it to track on an equatorial axis. It achieves this by having a surface that pivots about a "virtual polar axis". This gives equatorial tracking to anything sitting on the platform, from small cameras up to entire observatory buildings. These platforms are often used with altazimuth mounted amateur astronomical telescopes, such as the common Dobsonian telescope type, to overcome that type of mount's inability to track the night sky.

== See also ==
- Altazimuth mount
- Barn door tracker
- Equatorial room
- Hexapod-Telescope
- List of telescope parts and construction
- List of telescope types
- Parallactic angle
- Polar mount - a similar mount used with satellite dishes
- Poncet Platform
