= Polar alignment =

Method of orienting telescopes and other celestial observation devices

Polar alignment is the act of aligning the rotational axis of a telescope's equatorial mount or a sundial's gnomon with a celestial pole to parallel Earth's axis.

== Alignment methods ==
The method to use differs depending on whether the alignment is taking place in daylight or at night. Furthermore, the method differs if the alignment is done in the Northern Hemisphere or Southern Hemisphere. The purpose of the alignment also must be considered; for example, the value of accuracy is much more significant in astrophotography than in casual stargazing.

=== Aiming at the pole stars ===
In the Northern Hemisphere, sighting Polaris the North Star is the usual procedure for aligning a telescope mount's polar axis parallel to the Earth's axis. Polaris is approximately three-quarters of a degree from the North Celestial Pole, and is easily seen by the naked eye.

σ Octantis, sometimes known as the South Star, can be sighted in the Southern hemisphere to perform a polar alignment. At magnitude +5.6, it is difficult for inexperienced observers to locate in the sky. Its declination of -88° 57′ 23″ places it 1° 2′ 37" from the South Celestial Pole. An even closer star BQ Octantis of magnitude +6.9 lies 10' from the South Pole as of 2016. Although not visible to the naked eye, it is easily visible in most polar 'scopes. (It will lie closest to the South Pole, namely 9', in the year 2027.

Location of σ Octantis in the southern sky, with dashed lines as guides to the approximate location.

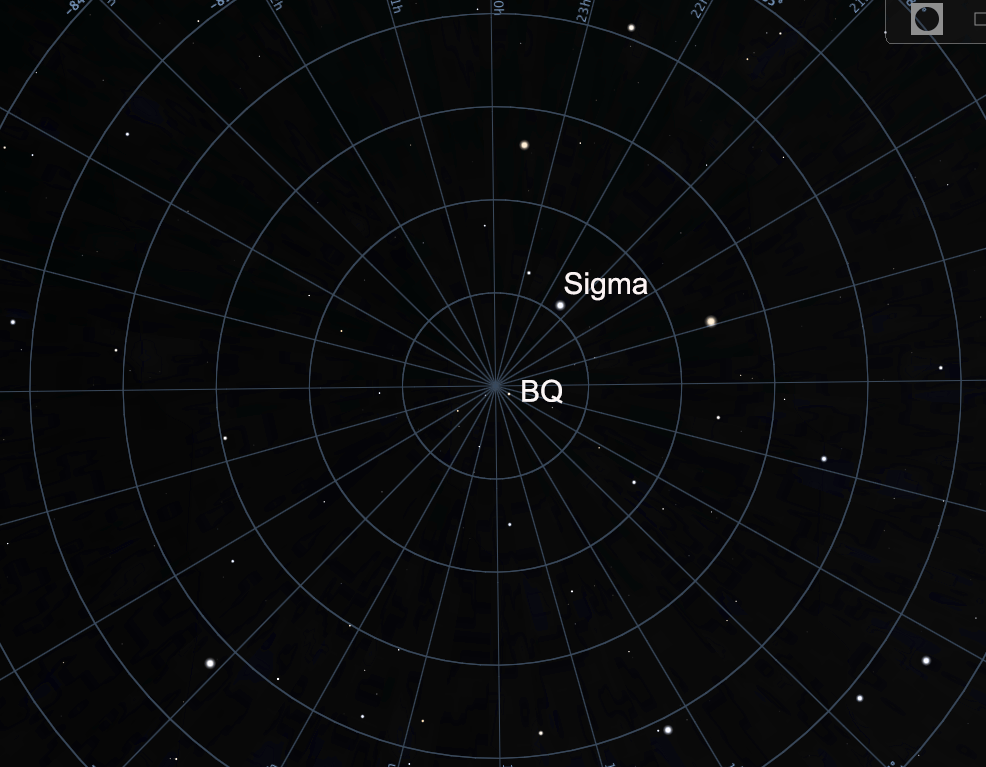
Celestial South Pole around 2016 and bright stars around it. Right ascension 0h is up and each circle is 1 degree of declination from the pole. The trapezoid top right is just visible to the naked eye.

=== Rough alignment method ===
In the Northern Hemisphere, rough alignment can be done by visually aligning the axis of the telescope mount with Polaris. In the Southern hemisphere or places where Polaris is not visible, a rough alignment can be performed by ensuring the mount is level, adjusting the latitude adjustment pointer to match the observer's latitude, and aligning the axis of the mount with true south or north by means of a magnetic compass. (This requires taking the local magnetic declination into account). This method can sometimes be adequate for general observing through the eyepiece or for very wide angle astro-imaging with a tripod-mounted camera; it is often used, with an equatorially-mounted telescope, as a starting point in amateur astronomy.

There are ways to improve the accuracy of this method. For example, instead of reading the latitude scale directly, a calibrated precision inclinometer can be used to measure the altitude of the polar axis of the mount. If the setting circles of the mount are then used to find a bright object of known coordinates, the object should mismatch only as to azimuth, so that centering the object by adjusting the azimuth of the mount should complete the polar alignment process. Typically, this provides enough accuracy to allow tracked (i.e. motorized) telephoto images of the sky.

For astro-imaging through a lens or telescope of significant magnification, a more accurate alignment method is necessary to refine the rough alignment, using one of the following approaches.

=== Polarscope method ===
An alignment suitable for visual observation and short exposure imaging (up to a few minutes) can be achieved with a polar scope. This is a low-magnification telescope mounted co-axially with the mount (and adjusted to maximize the accuracy of this alignment). A special reticle is used to align the mount with Polaris, or with a group of stars near the polar region in the Southern Hemisphere. While primitive polarscopes originally needed the careful adjustment of the mount to match the time of year and day, this process can be simplified using computer apps that calculate the correct position of the reticle. A new-style northern-hemisphere reticle uses a 'clock-face' style with 72 divisions (representing 20-minute intervals) and circles to compensate for the drift of Polaris over around thirty years. Use of this reticle can allow alignment to within an arc minute or two.

=== Drift alignment method ===
Drift alignment is a method to refine the polar alignment after a rough alignment is done. The method is based on attempting to track stars in the sky using the clock drive; any error in the polar alignment will show up as the drift of the stars in the eyepiece/sensor. Adjustments are then made to reduce the drift, and the process is repeated until the tracking is satisfactory. For the polar axis altitude adjustment, one can attempt to track a star low in the east or west. For the azimuth adjustment, one typically attempts to track a star close to the meridian, with declination about 20° from the equator, in the hemisphere opposite of the observing location.

=== Astrometric (plate) solving ===
For telescopes combined with an imaging camera connected to a computer, it is possible to achieve very accurate polar alignment (within 0.1 minutes of arc). An initial rough alignment is first performed using the polar scope. An image can then be captured and a star database is used to identify the exact field of view when aimed at stars near the pole - 'plate solving'. The telescope is then rotated ninety degrees around its right ascension axis and a new 'plate solve' is carried out. The error in the point around which the images rotate compared to the true pole is calculated automatically and the operator can be given simple instructions to adjust the mount for a more accurate polar alignment.

=== Mathematical, two-star polar alignment ===
The polar error in elevation and azimuth can be calculated by pointing the telescope to two stars or taking two astrometric solves of two positions and the measured error in right ascension and declination. From the difference between the right ascension and declination of the telescope encoder and the second's star position, the elevation and azimuth error of the polar alignment can be calculated. The basic formulas are as follows:
$$\begin{align}
\Delta\alpha &= \Delta e \cdot \tan \delta \cdot \sin h + \Delta a \cdot (\sin \Phi - \cos \Phi \cdot \tan \delta \cdot \cos h), \\
\Delta\delta &= \Delta e \cdot \cos h + \Delta a \cdot \cos \Phi \cdot \sin h,
\end{align}$$
where

$\alpha$ is right ascension,
$\delta$ is declination,
$\Phi$ is site latitude,
$h$ is the hour angle of the reference point equals ($\alpha$ − local sidereal time),
$\Delta\alpha$ is error in right ascension,
$\Delta\delta$ is error in declination,
$\Delta e$ is polar error in elevation (altitude),
$\Delta a$ is polar error in azimuth.

The inverse can be calculated if the above formula is written in matrix notation. So the polar error expressed in Δe and Δa can be calculated from the Δα and Δδ between the telescope encoder and the second reference star.

=== Polar alignment with Excel ===
Polar Alignment with Excel is a method for polar alignment of equatorial mountings for astronomical telescopes, using a digital camera and a computer.

==== Photography ====
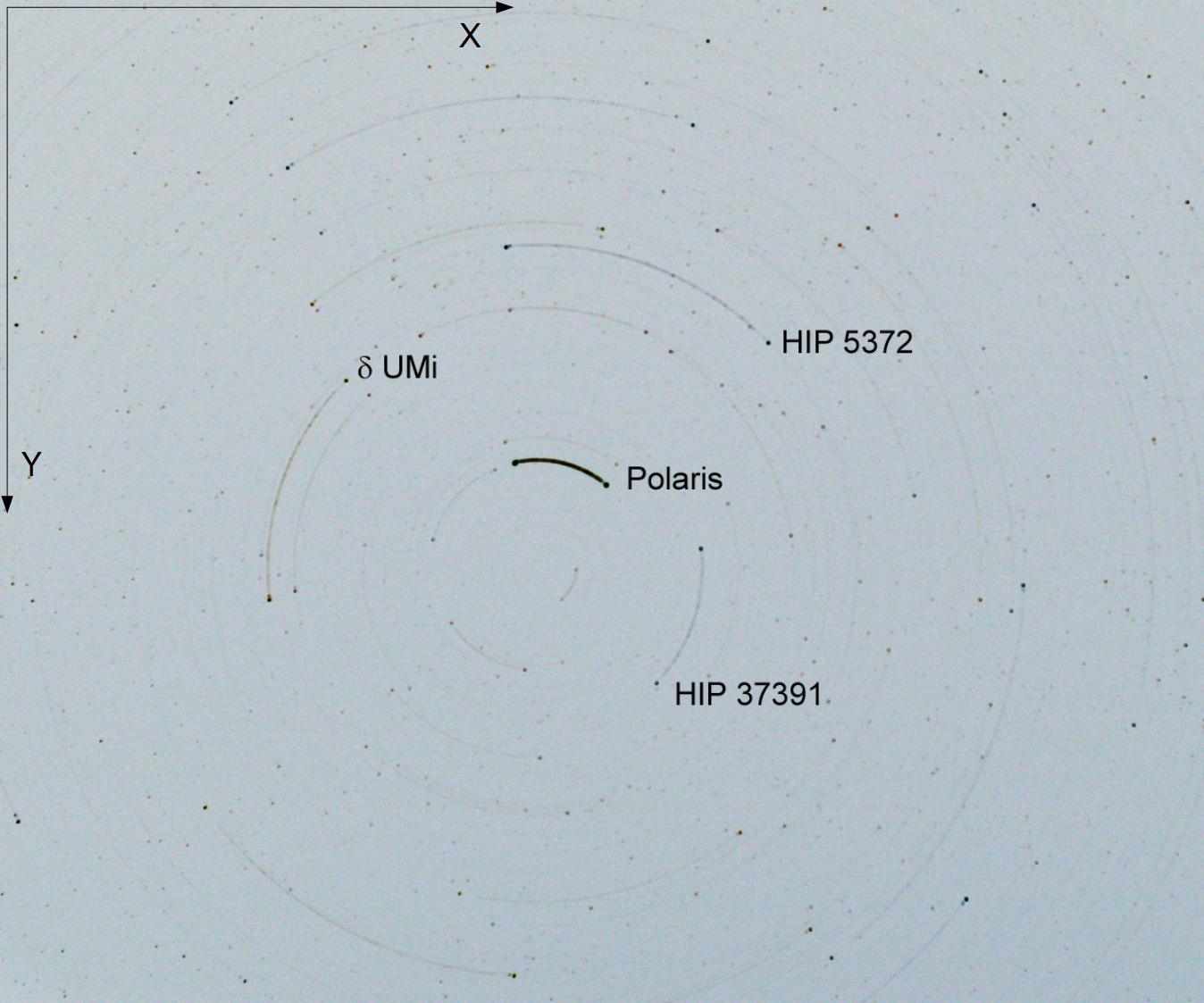
Star trail image of the north polar region

A digital camera with a standard lens is mounted on the telescope and pointed at the celestial pole. Exposure is set at "B" (Bulb) and an image is taken while the camera is slowly turned around the polar axis. This yields a kind of star-trail image. The beginning and the end of the star trails must be clearly marked with a few seconds of static exposure. Due to the rotation, the information about the current direction of the axis is hidden in the image. Alternatively, two static images can be taken, which differ by a rotation around the polar axis.

==== Evaluation ====
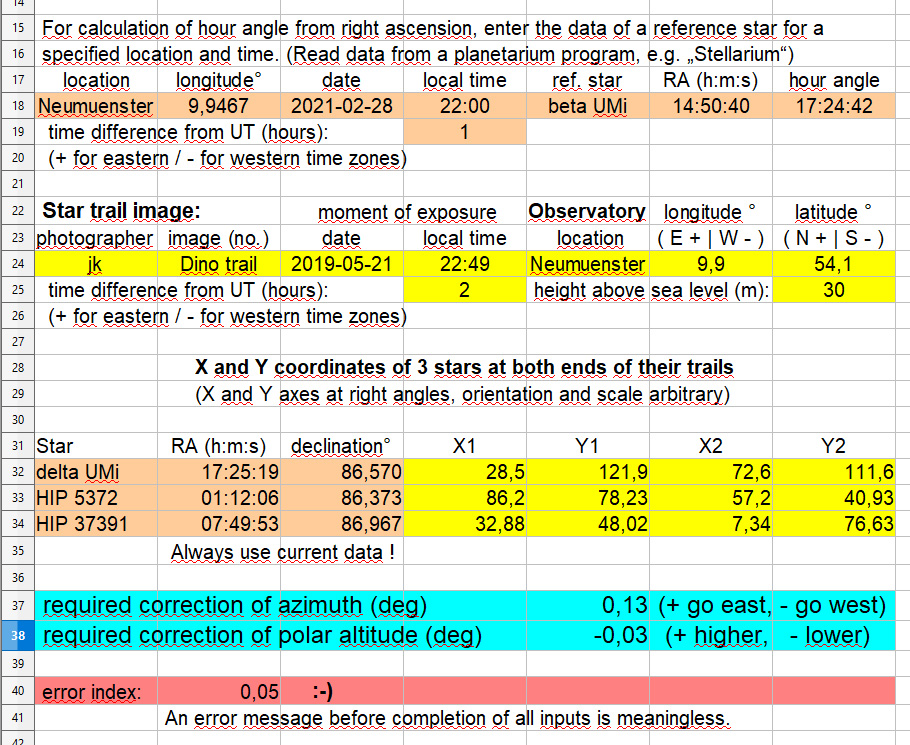
Interactive area of the Excel spreadsheet

For the evaluation of the images, a special Excel spreadsheet has been developed. For three stars, the rectangular X-Y-coordinates are measured at both ends of their trails or on both static images. In addition, we need the current right ascension and declination of the 3 stars, the longitude and latitude of the observatory, and the date and time the images were taken. The spreadsheet then outputs the necessary corrections of the azimuth and the pole height in degrees and, in an auxiliary field, the corresponding number of turns of the adjustment screws, thus allowing a direct approach to the correct alignment.

== Equipment ==
=== Crosshair eyepiece ===
A crosshair eyepiece is an ordinary ocular with the only difference being that it has a crosshair for aiming and measurement of the angular distance. This is useful in any type of polar alignment, but especially in drift.

=== Dedicated polar scope ===
A small telescope usually with an etched reticle is inserted into the rotational axis of the mount.

== See also ==
- Celestial pole
- Setting circles
- Inertial guidance system
- Tpoint
