= BQ Octantis =

Star in the constellation Octans

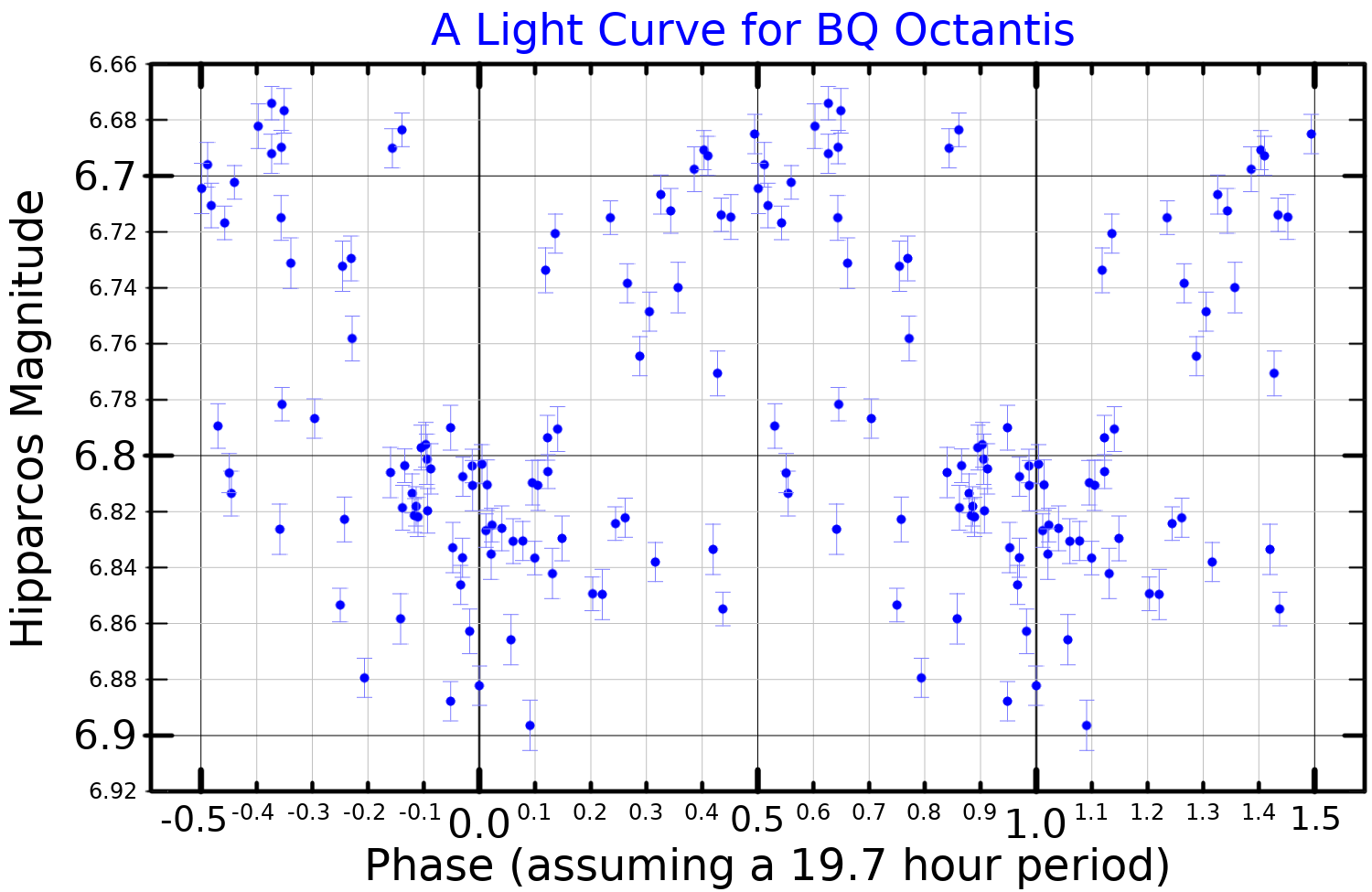
- A light curve for BQ Octantis, plotted from Hipparcos data

Observation data Epoch J2000.0 Equinox J2000.0
- Constellation: Octans
- Right ascension: 14^{h} 35^{m} 29.6633^{s}
- Declination: −89° 46′ 18.176″
- Apparent magnitude (V): 6.66 - 7.06

Characteristics
- Evolutionary stage: AGB
- Spectral type: S5,1
- Variable type: SRb

Astrometry
Radial velocity (R_{v})	−3.5 km/s
Proper motion (μ)	RA: −8.022 mas/yr Dec.: −8.668 mas/yr
Parallax (π)	1.8237±0.0296 mas
Distance	1,790 ± 30 ly (548 ± 9 pc)

Details
Mass	2.7 M_{☉}
Radius	197 R_{☉}
Luminosity	3,767 L_{☉}
Surface gravity (log g)	0.31 cgs
Temperature	3,520 K
Metallicity [Fe/H]	+0.10 dex

Other designations
- CD−89°10, FK5 3985, HD 110994, HIP 71348, SAO 258660

Database references
SIMBAD	data

BQ Octantis (BQ Oct) is a variable star in the constellation Octans. It is an S-type star with an apparent magnitude of 6.82. It lies less than a quarter degree from the South Celestial Pole (SCP), making it the closest star to the SCP brighter than magnitude 7. While it is much nearer the pole than Polaris Australis (the star commonly used as the south pole star), it is too dim to the naked eye to use as a visual reference.

BQ Octantis is a red giant on the asymptotic giant branch. Its spectrum has been classified as M3III or M4III. The spectrum shows abnormal abundances of s-process elements and particularly ZrO, so it is classified as an S star. These stars have dredged up fusion products from the interior, especially carbon. They have reached approximately equal levels of carbon and oxygen in their atmospheres, which causes dramatic changes to the atmospheric chemistry which are visible in the spectrum. As an S star, its spectrum is classified as S5,1, with S5 approximately equivalent to the temperature of an M5 giant and the 1 indicating that the ZrO bands are relatively weak.

BQ Octantis is a variable star. An amplitude of 0.05 magnitudes about an apparent magnitude of 6.82 has been derived from Hipparcos satellite photometry. The same photometry found a possible period of 0.82 d but this was very uncertain and no variability type could be determined. It is listed in the General Catalogue of Variable Stars as a possible slow irregular variable. It was classified as a variable star in 1977, on the basis of a 1960 study. All Sky Automated Survey data shows a period of 48.1 days
