= Altazimuth mount =

Support mechanism with rotation about the horizontal and vertical axes

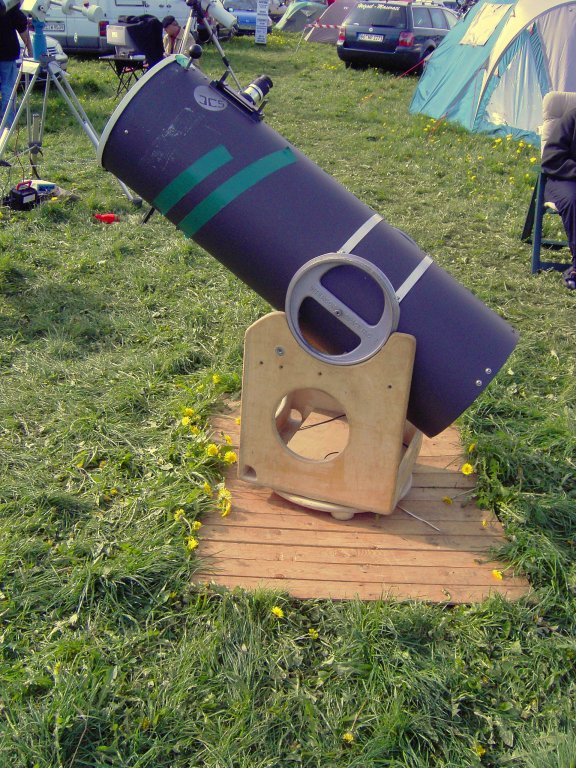
A Newtonian telescope on a simple Dobsonian mount

An altazimuth mount or alt-azimuth mount is a simple two-coordinate axis mount for supporting and rotating an instrument about two perpendicular axes – one vertical and the other horizontal. Rotation about the vertical axis varies the azimuth (compass bearing) of the pointing direction of the instrument. Rotation about the horizontal axis varies the altitude angle (angle of elevation) of the pointing direction.

These mounts are used, for example, with telescopes, cameras, radio antennas, heliostat mirrors, solar panels, and guns and similar weapons.

Several names are given to this kind of mount, including altitude-azimuth, azimuth-elevation and various abbreviations thereof. A gun turret is essentially an alt-azimuth mount for a gun, and a standard camera tripod is an alt-azimuth mount as well.

== Astronomical telescope altazimuth mounts ==
When used as an astronomical telescope mount, the biggest advantage of an alt-azimuth mount is the simplicity of its mechanical design. The primary disadvantage is its inability to follow astronomical objects in the night sky as the Earth spins on its axis. On the other hand, an equatorial mount only needs to be rotated about a single axis, at a constant rate, to follow the rotation of the night sky (diurnal motion). Altazimuth mounts need to be rotated about both axes at variable rates, achieved via microprocessor based two-axis drive systems, to track equatorial motion. This imparts an uneven rotation to the field of view that also has to be corrected via a microprocessor based counter rotation system. On smaller telescopes an equatorial platform is sometimes used to add a third "polar axis" to overcome these problems, providing an hour or more of motion in the direction of right ascension to allow for astronomical tracking. The design also does not allow for the use of mechanical setting circles to locate astronomical objects although modern digital setting circles have removed this shortcoming.

Another limitation is the problem of gimbal lock at zenith pointing. When tracking at elevations close to 90°, the azimuth axis must rotate very quickly; if the altitude is exactly 90°, the speed is infinite. Thus, altazimuth telescopes, although they can point in any direction, cannot track smoothly within a "zenith blind spot", commonly 0.5 or 0.75 degrees from the zenith. (i.e. at elevations greater than 89.5° or 89.25° respectively.)

=== Current applications ===
Typical current applications of altazimuth mounts include the following.

==== Research telescopes ====
In the largest telescopes, the mass and cost of an equatorial mount is prohibitive and they have been superseded by computer-controlled altazimuth mounts. The simple structure of an altazimuth mount allows significant cost reductions, in spite of the additional cost associated with the more complex tracking and image-orienting mechanisms. An altazimuth mount also reduces the cost in the dome structure covering the telescope since the simplified motion of the telescope means the structure can be more compact.

==== Amateur telescopes ====
- Beginner telescopes: Altazimuth mounts are cheap and simple to use.
- Dobsonian telescopes: John Dobson (astronomer) popularized a simplified altazimuth mount design for Newtonian reflectors because of its ease of construction; Dobson's innovation was to use non-machined parts for the mount that could be found in any hardware store such as plywood, formica, and plastic plumbing parts combined with modern materials like nylon or Teflon.
- "GoTo" telescopes: It has often proved more convenient to build a mechanically simpler altazimuth mount and use a motion control system to manipulate both axes simultaneously to track an object, when compared with a more mechanically complex equatorial mount that requires minimally complex control of a single motor.

== Gallery ==
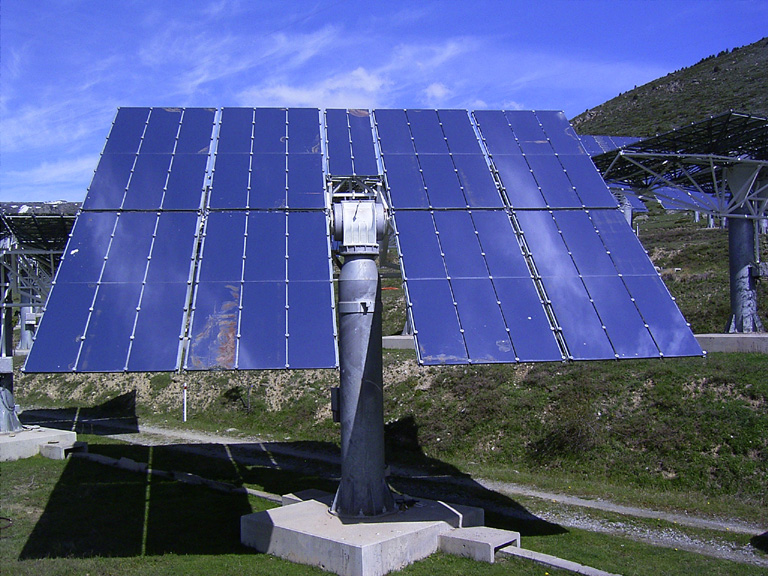
A heliostat at the THÉMIS experimental station in France. The mirror rotates on an alt-azimuth mount. The pointing direction of the mirror is perpendicular to its surface.

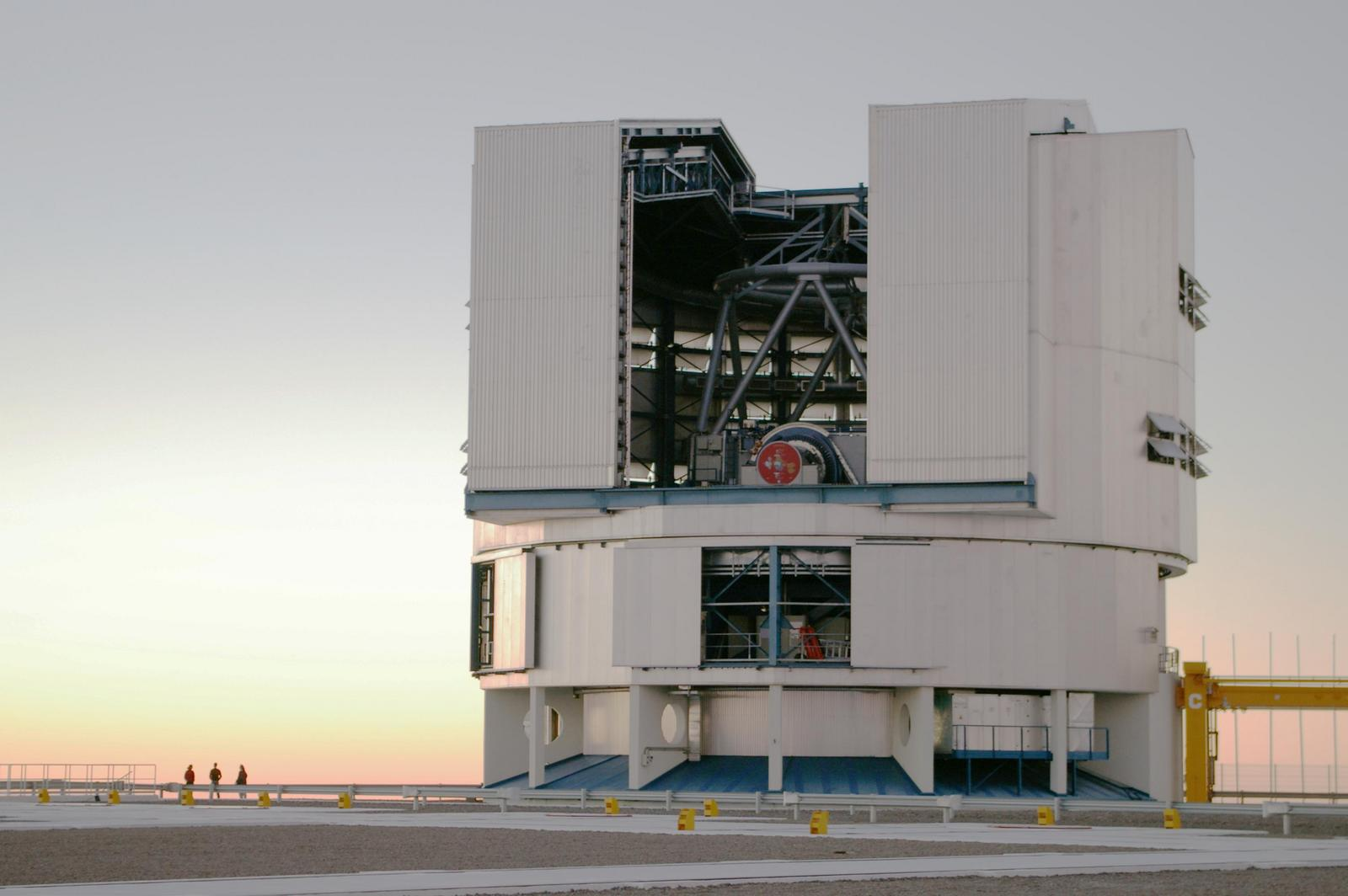
One of the 8.2 m (320 in) telescopes at Paranal Observatory. The entire building constitutes the altazimuth mount, saving on mass and cost.

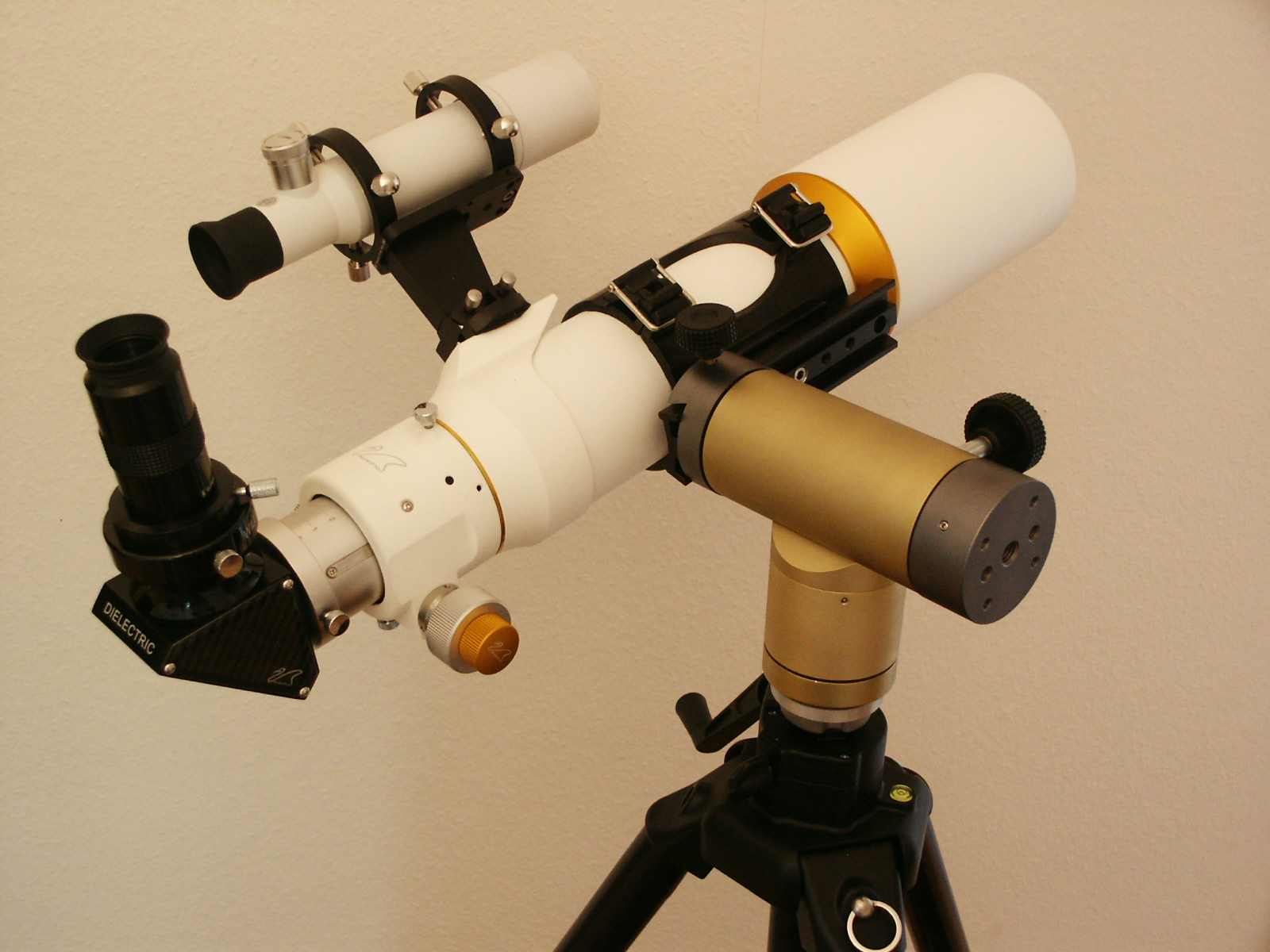
A refracting telescope (with finderscope and accessories) on a small alt-azimuth mount.

== See also ==
- Dobsonian mount
- Equatorial mount
- Heliostat
- Horizontal coordinate system – a system to locate objects on the celestial sphere via Alt-azimuth coordinates
- Parallactic angle
- Solar tracker
- Tripod
