= Setting circles =

Astronomy device for a telescope

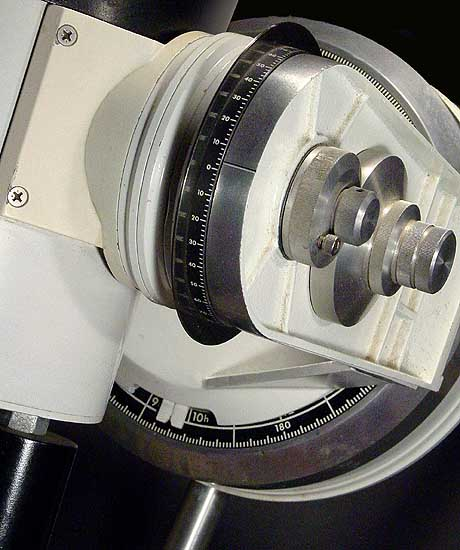
Setting circles on an equatorial fork-mounted telescope

Setting circles are used on telescopes equipped with an equatorial mount to find celestial objects by their equatorial coordinates, often used in star charts and ephemerides.

== Description ==
Setting circles consist of two graduated disks attached to the axes – right ascension (RA) and declination (DEC) – of an equatorial mount. The RA disk is graduated into hours, minutes, and seconds. The DEC disk is graduated into degrees, arcminutes, and arcseconds.

Since the RA coordinates are fixed onto the celestial sphere, the RA disk is usually driven by a clock mechanism in sync with sidereal time. Locating an object on the celestial sphere using setting circles is similar to finding a location on a terrestrial map using latitude and longitude. Sometimes the RA setting circle has two scales on it: one for the Northern Hemisphere and one for the Southern.

== Application ==
=== Research telescopes ===
Historically setting circles have rivaled the telescopes optics as far as difficulty in construction. Making a set of setting circles required a lot of precision crafting on a dividing engine. Setting circles usually had a large diameter and when combined with a vernier scale could point a telescope to nearly an arc minute of accuracy. In the 20th century setting circles were replaced with electronic encoders on most research telescopes.

=== Portable telescopes ===
In amateur astronomy, setting up a portable telescope equipped with setting circles requires:

- Polar alignment – The telescope must be aligned with either the north celestial pole or the south celestial pole. Polaris is roughly at the north pole, while Sigma Octantis is roughly at the south pole.
- Setting Right Ascension – After polar alignment, the observer uses a calculator or a known star to synchronize the right ascension circle with Sidereal Time.

Accuracy of pointing the telescope can be hard to achieve. Some sources of error are:

1. Less-than-perfect polar alignment
2. The optical tube not being perpendicular to the declination axis
3. The declination and right ascension axis not being perpendicular
4. Errors in rotating the setting circles when setting up
5. Errors in reading the setting circles
6. Confusion between Northern and Southern hour angles (Right Ascension)

It is common to blame an unlevel tripod as a source of error, however when proper polar alignment is performed, any induced error is factored out.

These sources of error add up and cause the telescope to point far from the desired object. They are also hard to control; for example, Polaris is often used as the celestial north pole for alignment purposes, but it is over half a degree away from the true pole. Also, even the finest graduations on setting circles are usually more than a degree apart, which makes them difficult to read accurately, especially in the dark. Nothing can be done if the optical tube is not perpendicular to the declination axis or if the R.A. and Dec axes are not perpendicular, because these problems are next to impossible to fix.

In the southern hemisphere the Right Ascension scale operates in reverse from the Northern Hemisphere. The term Right Ascension took its name from early northern hemisphere observers for whom "ascending stars" were on the east or right hand side. In the southern hemisphere the east is on the left when an equatorial mount is aligned on the south pole. Many Right Ascension setting circles therefore carry two sets of numbers, one showing the value if the telescope is aligned in the northern hemisphere, the other for the southern.

Even with some inaccuracies in polar alignment or the perpendicularity of the mount, setting circles can be used to roughly get to a desired object's coordinates, where a star chart can be used to apply the necessary correction. Alternatively, it is possible to point to a bright star very close to the object, rotate the circles to match the star's coordinates, and then point to the desired object's coordinates. Setting circles are also used in a modified version of star hopping where the observer points the telescope at a known object and then moves it a set distance in RA or declination to the location of a desired object.

== Digital setting circles ==
Digital setting circles (DSC) consist of two rotary encoders on both axis of the telescope mount and a digital readout. They give a highly accurate readout of where the telescope is pointed and their lit display makes them easier to read in the dark. They have also been combined with microcomputers to give the observer a large database of celestial objects and even guide the observer in correctly pointing their telescope. One of the earliest DIY examples by amateur astronomers and brothers David J. Guerra and John M. Guerra was described by Jearl Walker in Scientific American in 1979.

In contrast to a GOTO telescope mount, a mount equipped with DSC alone is sometimes called a "PUSH TO" mount.
