= Telescope mount =

Mechanical structure which supports a telescope

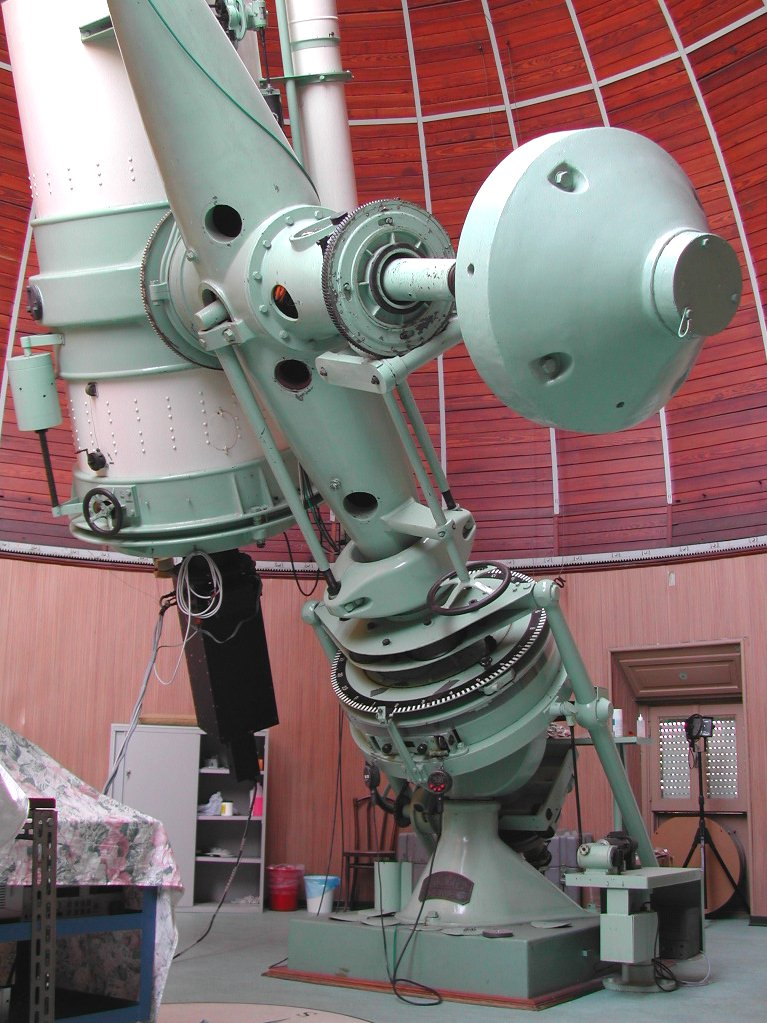
1 meter Zeiss telescope at Merate Astronomical Observatory, Merate (LC), Italy. (South support)

A telescope mount is a mechanical structure which supports a telescope. Telescope mounts are designed to support the mass of the telescope and allow for accurate pointing of the instrument. Many sorts of mounts have been developed over the years, with the majority of effort being put into systems that can track the motion of the fixed stars as the Earth rotates.

== Fixed mounts ==
Fixed telescope mounts are entirely fixed in one position, such as Zenith telescopes that point only straight up and the National Radio Astronomy Observatory's Green Bank fixed radio 'horn' built to observe Cassiopeia A.

== Fixed altitude mounts ==
Fixed-altitude mounts usually have the primary optics fixed at an altitude angle while rotating horizontally (in azimuth). They can cover the whole sky but only observe objects for the short time when that object passes a specific altitude and azimuth.

== Transit mounts ==
Transit mounts are single axis mounts fixed in azimuth while rotating in altitude, usually oriented on a north-south axis. This allows the telescope to view the whole sky, but only when the Earth's rotation allows the objects to cross (transit) through that narrow north-south line (the meridian). This type of mount is used in transit telescopes, designed for precision astronomical measurement. Transit mounts are also used to save on cost or where the instruments mass makes movement on more than one axis very difficult, such as large radio telescopes.

== Altazimuth mounts ==
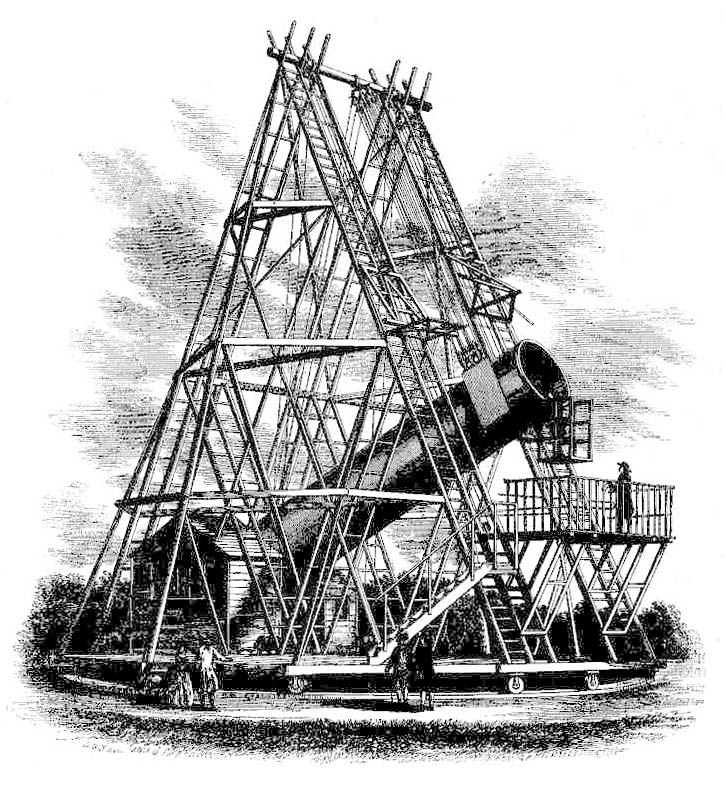
William Herschel's 49-inch (1,200 mm) 40-foot telescope on an altazimuth mount.

Altazimuth, altitude-azimuth, or alt-az mounts allow telescopes to be moved in altitude (up and down), or azimuth (side to side), as separate motions. This mechanically simple mount was used in early telescope designs and until the second half of the 20th century was used as a "less sophisticated" alternative to equatorial mounts since it did not allow tracking of the night sky. This meant until recently it was normally used with inexpensive commercial and hobby constructions. Since the invention of digital tracking systems, altazimuth mounts have come to be used in practically all modern large research telescopes. Digital tracking has also made it a popular telescope mount used in amateur astronomy.

Besides the mechanical inability to easily follow celestial motion the altazimuth mount does have other limitations. The telescope's field-of-view rotates at varying speed as the telescope tracks, whilst the telescope body does not, requiring a system to counter-rotate the field of view when used for astrophotography or other types of astronomical imaging. The mount also has blind spot or "zenith hole", a spot near the zenith where the tracking rate in the azimuth coordinate becomes too high to accurately follow equatorial motion (if the elevation is limited to +90 degrees).

== Alt-alt (altitude-altitude) mounts ==
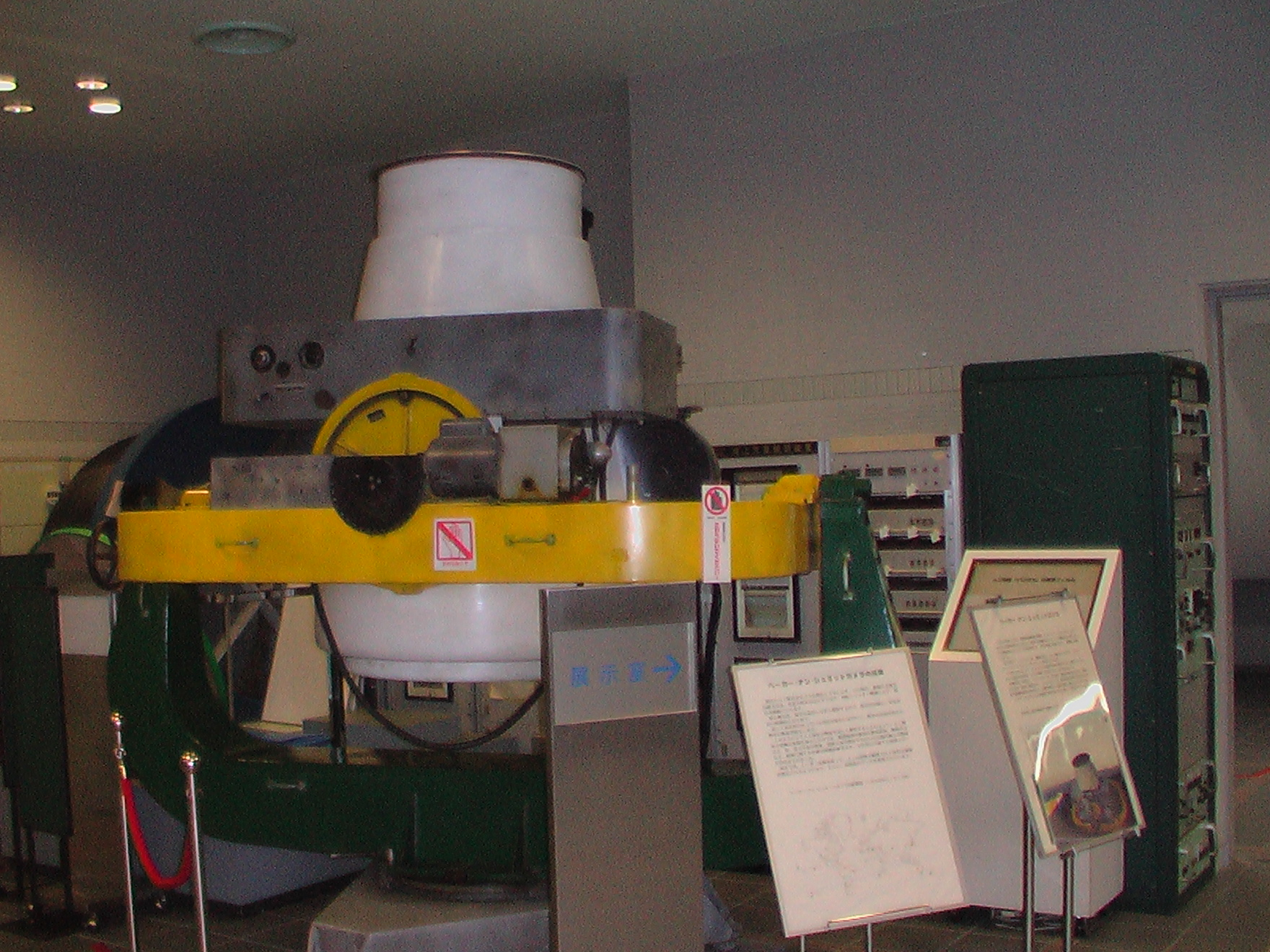
A Baker-Nunn satellite-tracking camera on an altitude-altitude-azimuth mount.

Alt-alt mounts, or altitude-altitude mounts, are designs similar to horizontal equatorial yoke mounts or Cardan suspension gimbals. This mount is an alternative to the altazimuth mount that has the advantage of not having a blind spot near the zenith, and for objects near the celestial equator the field rotation is minimized. It has the disadvantage of having all the mass, complexity, and engineering problems of its equatorial counterpart, so is only used in specialty applications such as satellite tracking. These mounts may include a third azimuth axis (an altitude-altitude-azimuth mount) to rotate the entire mount into an orientation that allows smoother tracking.

== Equatorial mounts ==
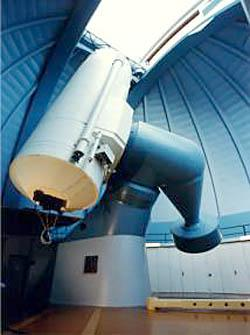
Equatorial mount (Stützmontierung) devised by Alfred Jensch

The equatorial mount has north-south "polar axis" tilted to be parallel to Earth's polar axis that allows the telescope to swing in an east-west arc, with a second axis perpendicular to that to allow the telescope to swing in a north-south arc. Slewing or mechanically driving the mount's polar axis in a counter direction to the Earth's rotation allows the telescope to accurately follow the motion of the night sky. Equatorial mounts come in different shapes, including German equatorial mounts (GEM in short), equatorial fork mounts, mixed variations on yoke or cross-axis mounts, and equatorial platforms such as the Poncet Platform.

Tilting the polar axis adds a level of complexity to the mount. Mechanical systems have to be engineered to support one or both ends of this axis (such as in fork or yoke mounts). Designs such as German equatorial or cross axis mounts also need large counter weights to counterbalance the mass of the telescope. Larger domes and other structures are also needed to cover the increased mechanical size and range of movement of equatorial mounts. Because of this, equatorial mounts become less viable in very large telescopes and have been pretty much replaced by altazimuth mounts for those applications.

== Hexapod-Telescope ==
Instead of the classical mounting using two axes, the mirror is supported by six extendable struts (Stewart-Gough platform). This configuration allows moving the telescope in all six spatial degrees of freedom and also provides strong structural integrity.

== See also ==
- GoTo (telescopes)
- History of the telescope
- List of telescope parts and construction
- List of telescope types
