= Flashing (cinematography) =

Photographic technique

In cinematography and photography, flashing is the exposure of the film or digital sensors to uniform light prior to exposing them to the scene. It is used as a method of contrast control to bring out detail in darker areas. This adds a bias to the overall light input recorded by the sensor. When used for artistic effects, it can be used to add a colour cast to shadows without significantly affecting highlights. Flashing is usually described as a percentage of exposure increase to the film's base fog level. While the flash itself is often a neutral color temperature, the flash exposure could be any color: the color of the flash will be imbued disproportionately into the shadows of the image.

== General ==
The effect is produced by adding a small and even level of exposure to the entire image. Since exposure levels increase logarithmically, this tiny level of additional exposure has no practical effect on an image's mid-tones or highlights, while it shifts the darker areas of the image into the practical sensitivity range, thus allowing the darker areas of the image to show visual detail rather than uniform blackness.

Flashing can be applied to the film stock before, during, or after the principal photography of a motion picture, although always before the film is processed. When applied before or after shooting, this is generally done by a film laboratory. The level of flashing needs to be tested beforehand and subsequently moderated appropriately against the light levels of the scene, or else it risks having a minimal impact if too low or making the shadows "milky" when too high.

== Historically ==
Adding a general overall exposure of light to a photosensitive material to alter the material's response to a captured image is a long-known technique. Photographer Ansel Adams describes the use of "pre-exposure," to make details visible in a darker area of an image, in his text The Negative (rev. ed. 1959). For more, study astronomical photographic techniques when silver-halide emulsions on glass plates were the available tools. With modern digital sensors that can capture high dynamic range, it is rarely used.

== Pre-flashing ==
This only applies when the film stock is exposed to low amounts of light in a laboratory.

=== Pre-flashing during acquisition ===
On-set flashing solutions include Panavision's Panaflasher, which is mounted in between the camera body and the camera magazine throat, Arri's Varicon, which functions as an illuminated filter and can be viewed directly through the viewfinder for manual setting of the flash level and the Burning Eye AV EELCON a modern multi color LED based illuminated filter similar in use to the Arri Varicon made to be used on Arri LMB style matteboxes.

== Post-flashing ==
This can be used to either bring up shadows or bring down highlights depending on if used on a negative or an interpositive.

== In cinematography ==
Cinematographer Vilmos Zsigmond used flashing very deliberately while filming Robert Altman's The Long Goodbye (1973). Zsigmond sought to create a sense of pastel light and subdued contrast appropriate to the film's retrospective 1950s Los Angeles mood. The MGM 2002 DVD re-release of The Long Goodbye includes an interview with Zsigmond in which he discusses his aesthetic goals for the film and his use of flashing to achieve them. In the March 1973 issue of American Cinematographer magazine (the text is included on the DVD), Edward Lipnick discussed Zsigmond's technique in detail. Lipnick credits cinematographer Freddie Young with the earlier use of flashing in cinema. Zsigmond worked closely with Skip Nicholson, then Technicolor's Manager of Photographic Services, to establish an acceptably predictable system to set the level of flashing to be used for a reel. For some scenes with deep shadow areas in which identifiable image detail was required, a flash "level" described by Zsigmond as "100%" was employed—though it is not clear that Zsigmond's measurement system was that noted in the preceding paragraph.

But, as Lipnick says at the opening of his 1973 American Cinematographer article: "Exposing your negative to varying amounts of light after you have shot it and before you have developed it, without being precisely certain what the results are going to look like, wouldn't seem like a technique designed to reduce the anxiety level of a cameraman shooting a major feature."

== In photography ==
It is also used in fields such as astronomy to bias CCD image sensors into a linear region, improving their low-light sensitivity.

=== Paper-flashing ===
When developing a photographic print, it is also possible to flash the printing paper to darken the highlights.

== In digital workflows ==
Now, digital image-processing technology can pull details out of shadow areas without risking destroying the dailies or rushes. However, current digital image chips are still limited in the light intensity range over which they can record detail. Depending on the scenario it might still be beneficial to use pre-flashing devices to lift the general exposure to lift the darkest parts above the threshold where excessive sensor noise is present.

== See also ==
- Photographic hypersensitization
- Pre-flash metering
- Pre-flashing
