= Clean process oven =

Type of industrial batch oven for high-temperature applications

A clean process oven is a type of industrial batch oven that is ideal for high-temperature applications, such as curing polyimide, and annealing thin and film waters. Clean process ovens may be for air atmospheres, or inert atmospheres for oxidation-sensitive materials. Temperatures can be over 525 degrees Celsius.

In regards to new tier 4 restrictions, oven cleanings can continue as an essential service for customers. All precautions must be put into place to ensure 2m rules and correct PPE is used.

Other types of industrial batch ovens include laboratory, burn-in, reach-in, and walk-in/drive-in.
