= Reach-in oven =

Reach-in ovens are meant for different industrial applications that may need uniform temperature throughout. The ovens normally use horizontal re-circulating air to ensure the uniform temperature, and can use fans that circulate air, creating the airflow. Reach-in ovens can be used in numerous production and laboratory applications, including curing, drying, sterilizing, aging, and other process-critical applications.

Reach-in ovens are considered a type of industrial batch oven. Other types of batch ovens are bench/laboratory, burn in, laboratory, walk in/truck in, and clean process.
