= Furnace roller =

A furnace roller or furnace roll is a heat resistant roller used in roller hearth furnaces and other industrial equipment. They are used to allow products to easily move into, through, and out of furnaces, kilns and ovens.

== Construction ==
Furnace rollers consist of a cylinder (solid or hollow) or disks mounted via bearings on a central shaft. They can be powered, actively moving items through the furnace, or unpowered. Furnace rollers can be made in many different sizes and from different materials to suit various applications and temperature ranges. Typical materials include nickel chromium and molybdenum.

== Applications ==
Furnace rollers are used in a wide variety of industries including the production of steel and ceramics, and the application of heat cured coatings.

== See also ==
- Oxidation
- Powder coating
- Heat treating
