= Batch oven =

Type of oven used for thermal processing

Batch ovens are a type of industrial oven used for thermal processing. They are used in numerous production and laboratory applications, including curing, drying, sterilizing, aging, and other process-critical applications. Sizes can vary depending on what type of thermal processing application is needed. Batch ovens are used mainly for single batch thermal processing. Cabinet and bench ovens are smaller batch ovens, and walk in/drive in ovens are larger and to be used for more variations of industrial applications.

Other types of batch ovens include laboratory, burn-in, reach-in, and clean process.

In a batch oven process, a set amount of material is placed inside the oven and heated for a specific period of time to reach the desired temperature or to cause a needed change, such as drying, curing, or altering its physical properties. Once the heating cycle is finished, the heat is turned off, the treated material is removed, and a new load is placed inside.

Batch Ovens can be used for a wide variety of heat processes including drying, curing, aging, annealing, stress relieving, bonding, tempering, preheating, and forming. Batch ovens are essentially heated boxes with insulated doors that process products one at a time or in groups. The part(s) to be processed are brought into the oven in batches on racks, carts, or trucks. Production requirements can accommodate manual or automated loading.
