= Photographic hypersensitization =

Photographic hypersensitization refers to a set of processes that can be applied to photographic film or plates before exposing. One or more of these processes is often needed to make photographic materials work better in long exposures.

Most photographic materials are designed for snapshot exposure of much less than one second. In longer exposures, such as those used in astrophotography, many such materials lose sensitivity. This phenomenon is known as low-intensity reciprocity failure (LIRF) or the Schwarzschild effect. The reciprocal relationship between flux and exposure time for photographic film implies that at a given light flux, doubling the exposure time would double the photographic effect. This holds with exposures up to a second or so, but in general does not hold over exposure times of minutes or hours. Several hypersensitization or "hypering" techniques have been developed to overcome this failure of the reciprocity law, and what follows refers mainly to work in astronomy.

== Causes of reciprocity failure ==
A developable photographic latent image forms when crystals of silver halide in an emulsion layer are exposed to light. The initial nucleation phase is chemically and thermodynamically unstable; it is thus temperature sensitive, and involves the production of one, or very few silver atoms as sub-latent image specks in each silver halide crystal. Once a clump of a few silver atoms has formed at one site within a crystal it is capable of triggering the development of the whole crystal. This greatly amplifies the effect of relatively few photons to produce a metallic silver image "grain". With low-intensity light, the sub-latent image speck may rapidly revert to silver halide before sufficient photons have been absorbed to make it stable. Hypersensitization techniques are intended to lengthen the lifetime of the unstable sub-latent image, to increase the chances of the silver halide crystal receiving enough light to form an image that will catalyze the action of the developer.

== Techniques of hypersensitization ==
Practical, user-applied hypersensitizing techniques have evolved over most of the last century and fall mostly into four types of treatments. Broadly, these involve liquid phase (washing), gas phase (out-gassing and baking and hydrogenation), exposure at lowered temperature, and pre-flashing. Some of these can be used in combination, but many severely shorten the shelf-life of a product and so can not be applied by the manufacturer.

=== Liquid-phase hypersensitization ===
Washing plates in water, dilute ammonia, triethanolamine or (more recently) silver nitrate solutions was found to be very effective, especially for red- and infrared-sensitive materials. Later types of fine grain, near-IR-sensitive plates were unusable without such hypersensitizing. However, much skill and persistence was required to obtain consistent and uniform results, especially with large plates, which were often treated at unsocial hours in observatory darkrooms on remote mountain tops.

The liquid-phase plate washing techniques operate by removing residual soluble bromides or iodides from the emulsion, thereby increasing the silver ion concentration in the vicinity of the photosensitive grain. However, this greatly reduced the shelf-life, and was usually done just before exposure and the plates were either developed immediately or stored at low temperatures before processing.

=== Gas-phase hypersensitization ===
Gas hypersensitization is the process of soaking or flushing the photographic film or plate for an extended period of time in nitrogen, hydrogen, or a hydrogen/nitrogen mixture called forming gas, sometimes with heating.

Some of the earliest gas-phase hypersensitization methods involved exposing the plates to mercury vapor before exposure to light. This was beneficial but was also hazardous and unreliable. More amenable was baking the plates in air in a moderate oven, usually in a light-tight metal box. Used from about 1940, this produced modest speed gains in the then-current coarse-grained emulsions. From about 1970, baking (about 65 °C for several hours) or prolonged soaking (20 °C for weeks) in an intermittent flow of nitrogen was used and could achieve a factor of 10 gain in speed for a one-hour exposure. In general this was used with the special "spectroscopic plates" made by the Eastman Kodak Company. These products were intended for long exposures, however it also worked to some extent with more conventional materials, including color film.

This process became especially important for the new generation of high detective quantum efficiency, fine-grained (but slow) plates Eastman Kodak had developed in the late 1960s. In 1974, researchers at Eastman Kodak announced that plates treated in pure hydrogen after nitrogen treatment were more sensitive at all exposure times than untreated plates, and this was quickly adopted by many observatories, some of whom used non-explosive forming gas (a 4–8% mixture of hydrogen in nitrogen) for reasons of safety. The optimum gas-phase processes combine the effects of heating and de-gassing with reduction sensitization by pure hydrogen to give a sensitivity gain of about 30 times for an hour-long exposure. This worked very well with fine-grain, high resolution emulsions on film, typified by Eastman Kodak's Tech Pan Film. They were also effective with negative and reversal color film, but were unpredictable and could produce difficult-to-correct shifts in color balance.

The gas-phase methods, especially nitrogen baking, involve the removal of traces of oxygen and water from the gelatin matrix, which increases the efficiency of the first stages of latent-image formation. Finally, hydrogen is a chemical reducing agent, which 'seeds' the dry, de-oxygenated silver halide crystal with a few atoms of silver. These are stable, sub-latent image clusters that subsequent photoelectrons from exposure to light can build into a several-atom latent image speck that catalyzes the development of the whole silver halide crystal. Photographic gelatin soaks up ambient moisture rapidly, so in humid climates, "hypered" plates were usually exposed at the telescope in an atmosphere of nitrogen.

In the AAS Photo Bulletin, Jack Marling describes the process of gas hypersensitizing Kodak Technical Pan Film. This was an extremely fine-grained, high-contrast, extended-red-sensitivity panchromatic film that benefited dramatically from hypersensitization. It has sadly been discontinued. Hypersensitization was also used, and can still be used, with other black-and-white materials and with color films, especially the Kodak Ektachrome line.

Hypersensitization with forming gas or hydrogen was widely used by professional astronomers on plates and by amateur astronomers on film up until the wide adoption of CCD astronomical cameras relieved them of the tedium. Amateurs were able to buy hypersensitizing equipment and gas from Lumicon or build their own hypering chambers. Details of the process can be found in books by Wallis and Provin, and Reeves, among others. Note that digital cameras of all sorts, including the DSLRs now widely used by amateur astronomers, have zero reciprocity failure and outperform even the best hypersensitized film.

=== Cold camera ===
It had been known since the 1930s that LIRF was less severe during low-temperature exposures. Cooling the emulsion during the exposure reduces reciprocity failure by extending the lifetime of the unstable single-atom stage of latent image formation. Accordingly, many experimenters built film cameras with 'cold backs', metal plates in contact with the film, often cooled with solid carbon dioxide. These were awkward to use because of film embrittlement and condensation, but some good results were obtained with color film, and cooling seemed to affect all the sensitive layers of color film equally, so shifts in color balance were small.

=== Preflashing and latensification ===
Preflashing is not strictly a hypersensitizing technique but it was often used in conjunction with Kodak's spectroscopic emulsions, sometimes together with hypering. It involves a brief, uniform, low-intensity flash of light sufficient to produce a small increase in the unexposed fog level. This was usually done just before a long exposure and gave modest increases in effective speed. Latensification works similarly but is applied after the exposure.

The techniques are useful when the main exposure was filtered or otherwise arranged so that the image being recorded was completely free from contamination by sky background or scattered light, as in narrow spectral band imaging. The main effect was to change the shape of the toe of the characteristic curve. In photographic terms, preflashing lowered contrast and improved the shadow detail without significantly affecting the highlights of the image.
