= Zinsmaster Baking Company Building =

Historic bakery, now apartments, in south Minneapolis

- U.S. National Register of Historic Places
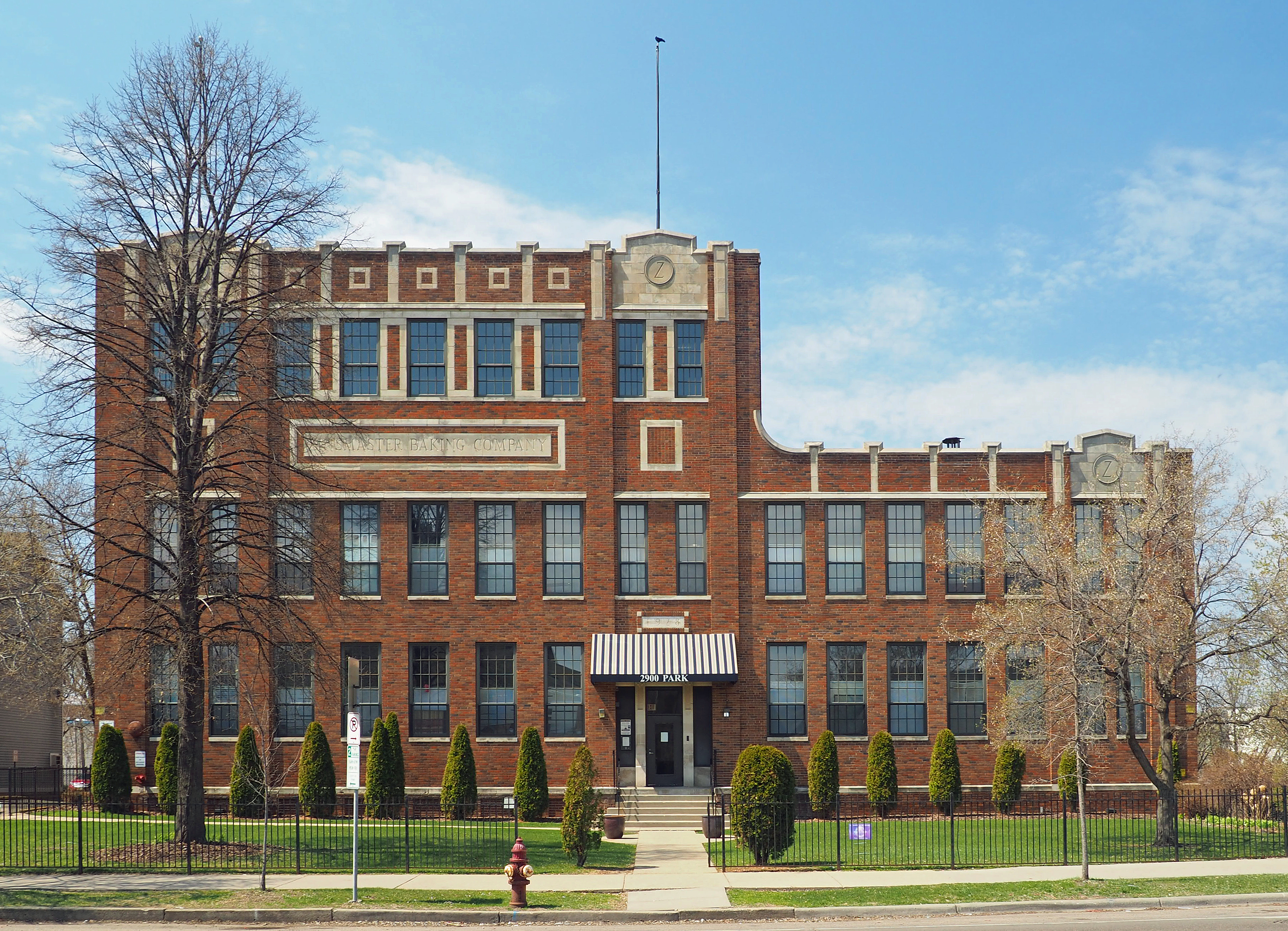
- Zinsmaster Baking Company factory (now Zinsmaster Apartments)

- Location within Minnesota
- Location: 2900 Park Ave., Minneapolis, Minnesota
- Coordinates: 44°57′00″N 93°15′57″W
- Area: 0.94 acres (0.38 ha)
- Architect: Charles W. DeJarnette
- Architectural style: Collegiate Gothic; Art Deco
- NRHP reference No.: 100005246
- Added to NRHP: June 3, 2020

The Zinsmaster Baking Company building is an industrial building in the Phillips neighborhood of Minneapolis, located just south of the Midtown Greenway (formerly a Milwaukee Road line). It was built in 1928, and in 1987 the building was converted into apartments. It was listed on the National Register of Historic Places in the areas of industry and commerce as an example of the rise of commercial bakeries. It also holds significance in the area of community planning and development because of the rezoning debate between industries and residents in Minneapolis.

Some sections of the building are three stories tall, while others are two stories tall. The first and second floors were used for baking, wrapping, and shipping, as well as offices. These two floors were converted to apartments in 1987. The third floor is mostly unaltered from its use as a bakery, housing two large rooms that were used for storing ingredients and mixing those ingredients together and for fermentation, as well as a few other smaller rooms used for locker rooms and lunchrooms for staff. The basement is largely unfinished and was used for flour storage and cold storage.

Store-bought bread was largely unknown until the turn of the 20th century. In 1890, 90 percent of bread was baked by women at home. Between 1890 and 1930, industrially-produced bread began to rise due to increased demand for commercial products brought on by the changing role of women in the household. Women of the middle and upper classes had the time and money to bake their own bread, whereas poor families relied on poor-quality bread produced in unsanitary factories. Some factories added plaster of Paris, borax, or chalk to extend the flour, and other factories often sold underweight loaves. In 1912, the National Association of Master Bakers (now the American Bakers Association) enacted a sanitary code to improve product quality, and new technologies such as automatic wrapping machines ensured bread protected from contamination. Moreover, when America entered World War I, civilians were asked to use less wheat because of rationing, using a mix of 75 percent wheat flour and 25 percent from flours of other grains. Homemakers were often inexperienced in mixing flours, resulting in ruined loaves and wasted wheat. The U.S. Food Administration encouraged consumers to eat industrially produced bread, where experienced bakers could use precise methods to bake breads with an efficient use of wheat flour. Other technologies, such as conveyor ovens, high-capacity mixers, dough shapers, and mechanical proofers streamlined the production process and reduced human interaction, improving cleanliness. Finally, the invention of the bread-slicing machine in 1928 and the advent of truck-based delivery led to larger sales, and by 1930, industrial bakeries were baking 80 percent of the nation's commercially-available bread.

Harry W. Zinsmaster and R.F. Smith opened the Zinsmaster-Smith Bread Company in 1913 in Duluth, Minnesota. A brochure from that time period ensured that "absolute cleanliness will be the watchword in every department." They also offered tours of their factories to show the public that they were clean, as well as showing off technical advancements. The company opened bakeries in St. Paul, Minnesota in 1919, Hibbing, Minnesota in 1922, and Superior, Wisconsin in 1925. When the bread slicer was introduced, Zinsmaster was the first company using it in northern Minnesota.

In the mid-1920s, the company began planning a fifth plant to be located in Minneapolis, selecting a site along the Milwaukee Road corridor along with many other industries. The problem was that the Zinsmaster site faced Park Avenue, a residential street with many wealthy residents. The company submitted a zoning change request in September 1927, promising to set the building back 50 feet (15 m) from Park Avenue and providing a landscape buffer. Homeowners initially had few objections, but later in that month, a group of residents went to the Minneapolis City Council to protest the rezoning. They were concerned that the company would be noisy and smelly and would degrade the aesthetics of Park Avenue. Zinsmaster asserted that part of the site was already zoned for light industry, and that a bakery would be a better use of the site than "some really objectionable industry". Other similar zoning arguments around that time were giving Minneapolis a reputation of being hostile to industrial development. On October 14, 1927, the Minneapolis City Council voted to rezone the site to light industrial. The Planning Commission requested a review of the architectural and landscaping plans for the new factory to ensure that the building complemented the neighborhood. Zinsmaster hired Charles W. DeJarnette of Des Moines to design the new factory, which ended up being significantly more ornate than their other factories and reflecting the fine architecture of Park Avenue. They also wanted the building to serve as a flagship factory for the company and to serve as "a good advertisement for a quality product". Construction on the new factory started as soon as the Planning Commission approved the plans, and the factory opened on April 10, 1929.

Zinsmaster continued to invest in improvements as new technology developed. At first, their bread was wrapped in waxed paper, but by the 1930s, waterproof cellophane wrappers became available. The company partnered with the Minnesota Mining and Manufacturing Company (now 3M) and used Scotch Tape to seal the packages. In 1949, the company gained the ability to order flour in 3,000 pounds (1,400 kg) to 3,500 pounds (1,600 kg) bins, which was more efficient than the 100 pounds (45 kg) sacks previously employed.

Harry Zinsmaster stepped down from his position as president of the company in 1959, but remained chair of the board until his death in 1977. In December 1977, the Metz Baking Company of Iowa purchased the company and took over the factory. Metz attempted to expand the factory, but met with fierce opposition from the neighborhood. Unable to expand, Metz closed the factory in 1980. In 1987, the first and second floors were converted into apartments.
