= Roller hearth furnace =

Type of industrial furnace

A roller hearth furnace is a type of industrial furnace used for heat treating material in continuous and index-continuous production processes.

== Construction ==
Roller hearth furnaces are built with two openings opposite each other to allow items to pass into, through and out of the furnace while moving in one direction. Depending on their application and operating temperature they may contain either a conveyor belt or furnace rollers for the movement of items through the furnace. Various heating methods are available, including gas-fire and resistive heating.

== See also ==
- Industrial furnace
- Kiln
- Industrial oven
