= Burn-in oven =

Burn-in ovens in electronics device fabrication, are designed for dynamic and static burn-in of integrated circuits and other electronic devices, including laser diodes. Typical sizes are from under ten to over 30 cubic feet (0.85 m^{3}), with air or nitrogen configurations. Operating temperatures can go over 260 °C (500 °F), and can use both single and multiple temperature settings.

Burn-in oven applications can be used in numerous different applications such as high-dissipation forward bias, high-temperature reverse bias, dynamic and static burn-in of microprocessors and other semiconductor devices.

Burn-in ovens are considered a type of batch oven. Other types of batch ovens are bench/laboratory, reach-in, walk in/truck in, and clean process.

One company builds systems designed for burn-in of low power laser diodes up to 1A and high power laser diodes up to 300A.
