= Endothermic gas =

Endothermic gas is a gas that inhibits or reverses oxidation on the surfaces it is in contact with. This gas is the product of incomplete combustion in a controlled environment. An example mixture is hydrogen gas (H_{2}), nitrogen gas (N_{2}), and carbon monoxide (CO). The hydrogen and carbon monoxide are reducing agents, so they work together to shield surfaces from oxidation.

Endothermic gas is often used as a carrier gas for gas carburizing and carbonitriding. An endothermic gas generator could be used to supply heat to form an endothermic reaction.

Synthesised in the catalytic retort(s) of endothermic generators, the gas in the endothermic atmosphere is combined with an additive gas including natural gas, propane (C_{3}H_{8}) or air and is then used to improve the surface chemistry work positioned in the furnace.

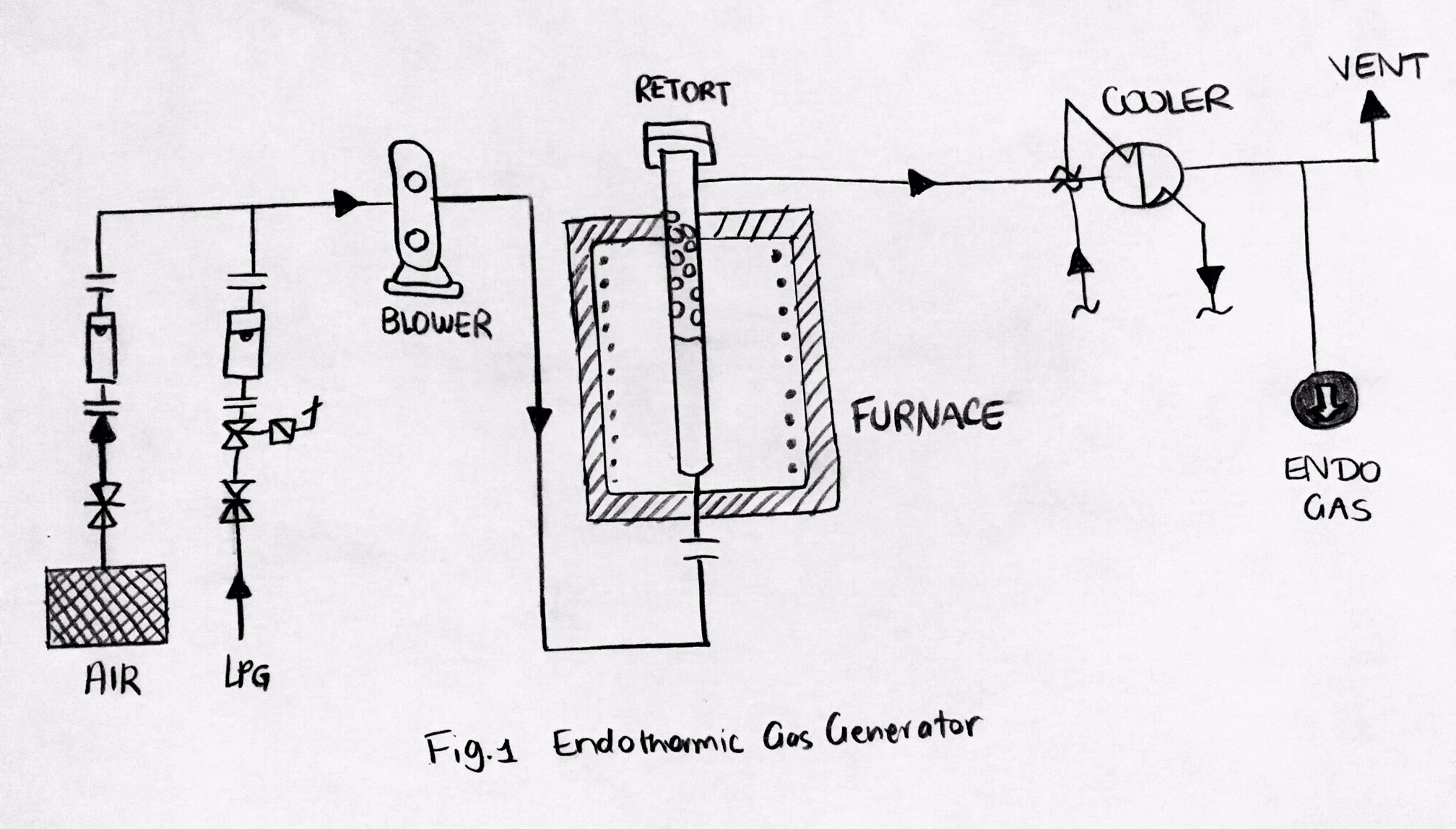
Endothermic Gas Generator

== Purposes ==
There are two common purposes of the atmospheres in the heat treating industry:

1. Protect the processed material from surface reactions (chemically inert)
2. Allow surface of processed material to change (chemically reactive)

== Principal components of a endothermic gas generator ==
Principal components of endothermic gas generators:

1. Heating chamber for supplying heat by electric heating elements of combustion,
2. Vertical cylindrical retorts,
3. Tiny, porous ceramic pieces that are saturated with nickel, which acts as a catalyst for the reaction,
4. Cooling heat exchanger in order to cool the products of the reaction as quickly as possible so that it reaches a particular temperature which stops any further reaction,
5. Control system which will help maintain the consistency of the temperature of the reaction which will help adjust the gas ratio, providing the wanted dew point.

== Chemical composition ==
Chemistry of endothermic gas generators:

- N_{2} (nitrogen) → 45.1% (volume)
- CO (carbon monoxide) → 19.6% (volume)
- CO_{2} (carbon dioxide) → 0.4% (volume)
- H_{2} (hydrogen) → 34.6% (volume)
- CH_{4} (methane) → 0.3% (volume)
- Dew point → +20/+50
- Gas ratio → 2.6:1

== Applications ==
Applications of endothermic gas generators:

1. Annealing: iron and steel
2. Brazing: copper and silver
3. Carbon restoration: carburizing, carbonitriding, nitrocarburizing
4. Neutral hardening: low, medium and high alloy carbon steels
5. Normalizing: iron and steel
6. Sintering: powder metals
7. Austempering: ductile iron

It is relatively simple to operate and maintain endothermic gas generators, however, maintenance such as the burnout process is often overlooked.

== See also ==
- Forming gas
