= Forming gas =

Mixture of hydrogen and nitrogen

Forming gas is a mixture of hydrogen (mole fraction varies) and nitrogen. It is sometimes called a "dissociated ammonia atmosphere" due to the reaction which generates it:

2 NH_{3} → 3 H_{2} + N_{2}

It can also be manufactured by thermal cracking of ammonia, in an ammonia cracker or forming gas generator.

Forming gas is used as an atmosphere for processes that need the properties of hydrogen gas. Typical forming gas formulations (5% H_{2} in N_{2}) are not explosive. It is used in chambers for gas hypersensitization, a process in which photographic film is heated in forming gas to drive out moisture and oxygen and to increase the base fog of the film. Hypersensitization is used particularly in deep-sky astrophotography, which deals with low-intensity incoming light, requires long exposure times, and is thus particularly sensitive to contaminants in the film.

Forming gas is also used to regenerate catalysts in glove boxes and as an atmosphere for annealing processes. It can be purchased at welding supply stores. It is sometimes used as a reducing agent for high-temperature soldering and brazing, to remove oxidation of the joint without the use of flux. It also finds application in microchip production, where a high-temperature anneal in forming gas assists in silicon-silicon dioxide interface passivation.

Quite often forming gas is used in furnaces during annealing or sintering for the thermal treatment of metals, because it reduces oxides on the metal surface.

== See also ==
- Endothermic gas
