= Chandley Ovens =

British commercial oven manufacturer

- Type: Privately held company
- Industry: Manufacturing
- Founded: 1944; 82 years ago
- Founders: Tom and Sadie Chandley
- Headquarters: Hyde, Cheshire, United Kingdom
- Area served: United Kingdom
- Products: Ovens manufacture
- Website: www.chandleyovens.co.uk

Chandley Ovens is a British manufacturer of commercial ovens for bakeries. The company is based in Greater Manchester, and are one of the UK's leading bakery engineering companies building commercial ovens.

Since 2022, the company has been headquartered in Tame Business Park in Cheshire.

== History ==
Chandley Ovens Ltd was founded in 1944 by Tom and Sadie Chandley in Manchester, England. In the aftermath of the Blitz, they established the company with a vision to support the baking industry through durable and innovative commercial ovens.

In 2022, the company relocated from Tameside near the M60/M67/A57 Denton Interchange in Denton, Greater Manchester on the Windmill Lane Industrial Estate to a new site at Tame Business Park in Cheshire.

In 2022 the company transitioned into a fully employee-owned business.

== Products ==
The company makes large commercial ovens for bakeries and fast-food outlets.

- Deck ovens
- Conveyor ovens
