= Reciprocity (photography) =

Inverse relationship between the intensity and duration

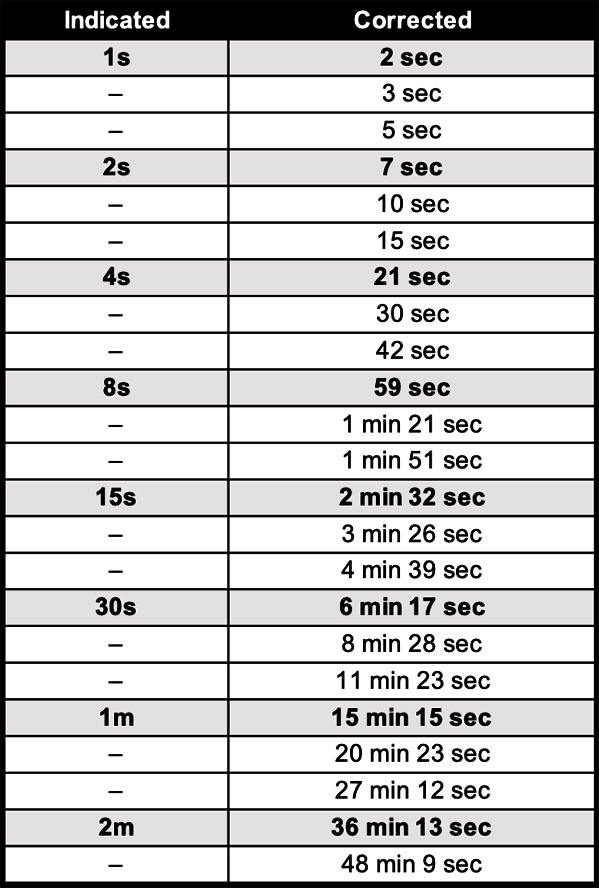
The specified times apply to black/white film. Note that the times are approximate, and vary between different films and ASA numbers, but the table shows in general how the exposure time is adjusted.

In photography, reciprocity is the inverse relationship between the intensity and duration of light that determines the reaction of light-sensitive material. Within a normal exposure range for film stock, for example, the reciprocity law states that the film response will be determined by the total exposure, defined as intensity × time. Therefore, the same response (for example, the optical density of the developed film) can result from reducing duration and increasing light intensity, and vice versa.

The reciprocal relationship is assumed in most sensitometry, for example when measuring a Hurter and Driffield curve (optical density versus logarithm of total exposure) for a photographic emulsion. Total exposure of the film or sensor, the product of focal-plane illuminance times exposure time, is measured in lux seconds.

== History ==
The idea of reciprocity, once known as Bunsen–Roscoe reciprocity, originated from the work of Robert Bunsen and Henry Roscoe in 1862.

Deviations from the reciprocity law were reported by Captain William de Wiveleslie Abney in 1893, and extensively studied by Karl Schwarzschild in 1899. Schwarzschild's model was found wanting by Abney and by Englisch, and better models have been proposed in subsequent decades of the early twentieth century. In 1913, Kron formulated an equation to describe the effect in terms of curves of constant density, which J. Halm adopted and modified, leading to the "Kron–Halm catenary equation" or "Kron–Halm–Webb formula" to describe departures from reciprocity.

== In chemical photography ==
In photography, reciprocity refers to the relationship whereby the total light energy – proportional to the total exposure, the product of the light intensity and exposure time, controlled by aperture and shutter speed, respectively – determines the effect of the light on the film. That is, an increase of brightness by a certain factor is exactly compensated by a decrease of exposure time by the same factor, and vice versa. In other words, there is under normal circumstances a reciprocal proportion between aperture area and shutter speed for a given photographic result, with a wider aperture requiring a faster shutter speed for the same effect. For example, an EV of 10 may be achieved with an aperture (f-number) of f/2.8 and a shutter speed of 1/125 s. The same exposure is achieved by doubling the aperture area to f/2 and halving the exposure time to 1/250 s, or by halving the aperture area to f/4 and doubling the exposure time to 1/60 s; in each case the response of the film is expected to be the same.

== Reciprocity failure ==
For most photographic materials, reciprocity is valid with good accuracy over a range of values of exposure duration, but becomes increasingly inaccurate as this range is departed from: this is reciprocity failure (reciprocity law failure, or the Schwarzschild effect). As the light level decreases out of the reciprocity range, the increase in duration, and hence of total exposure, required to produce an equivalent response becomes higher than the formula states; for instance, at half of the light required for a normal exposure, the duration must be more than doubled for the same result. Multipliers used to correct for this effect are called reciprocity factors (see model below).

At very low light levels, film is less responsive. Light can be considered to be a stream of discrete photons, and a light-sensitive emulsion is composed of discrete light-sensitive grains, usually silver halide crystals. Each grain must absorb a certain number of photons in order for the light-driven reaction to occur and the latent image to form. In particular, if the surface of the silver halide crystal has a cluster of approximately four or more reduced silver atoms, resulting from absorption of a sufficient number of photons (usually a few dozen photons are required), it is rendered developable. At low light levels, i.e. few photons per unit time, photons impinge upon each grain relatively infrequently; if the four photons required arrive over a long enough interval, the partial change due to the first one or two is not stable enough to survive before enough photons arrive to make a permanent latent image center.

This breakdown in the usual tradeoff between aperture and shutter speed is known as reciprocity failure. Each different film type has a different response at low light levels. Some films are very susceptible to reciprocity failure, and others much less so. Some films that are very light sensitive at normal illumination levels and normal exposure times lose much of their sensitivity at low light levels, becoming effectively "slow" films for long exposures. Conversely some films that are "slow" under normal exposure duration retain their light sensitivity better at low light levels.

For example, for a given film, if a light meter indicates a required exposure value of 5 and the photographer sets the aperture to f/11, then ordinarily a 4-second exposure would be required; a reciprocity correction factor of 1.5 would require the exposure to be extended to 6 seconds for the same result. Reciprocity failure generally becomes significant at exposures of longer than about 1 second for film, and above 30 seconds for photographic paper.

Reciprocity also breaks down at extremely high levels of illumination with very short exposures. This is a concern primarily for scientific and technical photography, as exposures significantly shorter than a millisecond (1/1000 second) are only required for subjects such as explosions and in particle physics, or when taking high-speed motion pictures with very high shutter speeds (1/10,000 sec or faster).

== Schwarzschild law ==
In response to astronomical observations of low intensity reciprocity failure, Karl Schwarzschild wrote (circa 1900):

"In determinations of stellar brightness by the photographic method I have recently been able to confirm once more the existence of such deviations, and to follow them up in a quantitative way, and to express them in the following rule, which should replace the law of reciprocity: Sources of light of different intensity I cause the same degree of blackening under different exposures t if the products $I \times t^{0.86}$ are equal."

Unfortunately, Schwarzschild's empirically determined 0.86 coefficient turned out to be of limited usefulness. A modern formulation of Schwarzschild's law is given as

$$E = It^p \$$

where E is a measure of the "effect of the exposure" that leads to changes in the opacity of the photosensitive material (in the same degree that an equal value of exposure H = It does in the reciprocity region), I is illuminance, t is exposure duration and p is the Schwarzschild coefficient.

However, a constant value for p remains elusive, and has not replaced the need for more realistic models or empirical sensitometric data in critical applications. When reciprocity holds, Schwarzschild's law uses p = 1.0.

Since the Schwarzschild's law formula gives unreasonable values for times in the region where reciprocity holds, a modified formula has been found that fits better across a wider range of exposure times. The modification is in terms of a factor the multiplies the ISO film speed:

Relative film speed $= (t + 1)^{(p - 1)} \$

where the t + 1 term implies a breakpoint near 1 second separating the region where reciprocity holds from the region where it fails.

=== Simple model for t > 1 second ===
Some models of microscope use automatic electronic models for reciprocity failure compensation, generally of a form for correct time, T_{c}, expressible as a power law of metered time, T_{m}, that is, T_{c}=(T_{m})^{p}, for times in seconds. Typical values of p are 1.25 to 1.45, but some are low as 1.1 and high as 1.8.

== The Kron–Halm catenary equation ==
Kron's equation as modified by Halm states that the response of the film is a function of $I t / \psi \$, with the factor defined by a catenary (hyperbolic cosine) equation accounting for reciprocity failure at both very high and very low intensities:

$$\psi = \frac{1}{2}[(I/I_0)^a + (I/I_0)^{-a}]$$

where I_{0} is the photographic material's optimum intensity level and a is a constant that characterizes the material's reciprocity failure.

== Quantum reciprocity-failure model ==
Modern models of reciprocity failure incorporate an exponential function, as opposed to power law, dependence on time or intensity at long exposure times or low intensities, based on the distribution of interquantic times (times between photon absorptions in a grain) and the temperature-dependent lifetimes of the intermediate states of the partially exposed grains.

Baines and Bomback explain the "low intensity inefficiency" this way:

Electrons are released at a very low rate. They are trapped and neutralised and must remain as isolated silver atoms for much longer than in normal latent image formation. It has already been observed that such extreme sub-latent image is unstable, and it is postulated that ineffiency is caused by many isolated atoms of silver losing their acquired electrons during the period of instability.

== Astrophotography ==
Reciprocity failure is an important effect in the field of film-based astrophotography. Deep-sky objects such as galaxies and nebulae are often so faint that they are not visible to the un-aided eye. To make matters worse, many objects' spectra do not line up with the film emulsion's sensitivity curves. Many of these targets are small and require long focal lengths, which can push the focal ratio far above f/5. Combined, these parameters make these targets extremely difficult to capture with film; exposures from 30 minutes to well over an hour are typical. As a typical example, capturing an image of the Andromeda Galaxy at f/4 will take about 30 minutes; to get the same density at f/8 would require an exposure of about 200 minutes.

When a telescope is tracking an object, every minute is difficult; therefore, reciprocity failure is one of the biggest motivations for astronomers to switch to digital imaging. Electronic image sensors have their own limitation at long exposure time and low illuminance levels, not usually referred to as reciprocity failure, namely noise from dark current, but this effect can be controlled by cooling the sensor.

== Holography ==
A similar problem exists in holography. The total energy required when exposing holographic film using a continuous wave laser (i.e. for several seconds) is significantly less than the total energy required when exposing holographic film using a pulsed laser (i.e. around 20–40 nanoseconds) due to a reciprocity failure. It can also be caused by very long or very short exposures with a continuous wave laser. To try to offset the reduced brightness of the film due to reciprocity failure, a method called latensification can be used. This is usually done directly after the holographic exposure and using an incoherent light source (such as a 25–40 W light bulb). Exposing the holographic film to the light for a few seconds can increase the brightness of the hologram by an order of magnitude.
