= Gradient oven tester =

Testing instrument which simulates the conditions of a production oven

A gradient oven tester is a testing instrument which simulates the conditions of a production oven in the lab. It is used to test the baking and drying properties of liquid/powder coatings, resins, plastics, etc. and can determine how these materials will react when placed under extreme stress from heat, but more importantly can determine the temperature needed for drying as well as how long it will take for these materials to dry and harden once applied. The usage of the oven guarantees that these things are known prior to production which aids product consistency.

Gradient ovens can also be used to artificially simulate natural weathering processes in the laboratory. A gradient oven can produce a linearly varying gradient of temperatures within different parts of the oven. Gradient ovens have also been used for paint research. Gradient ovens are also used in thermochromatography, which is a form of gas-liquid chromatography.

The gradient oven tester has a heating bank which has 45 heating elements each of which contain a Pt-100 temperature probe. Each element is individually insulated which allows for the setting of different temperatures in two adjoining elements.
