= Burn-in =

Process by which components of a system are exercised before being placed in service

Burn-in periods correspond to the early portion of the bathtub curve, where early failures decrease over time

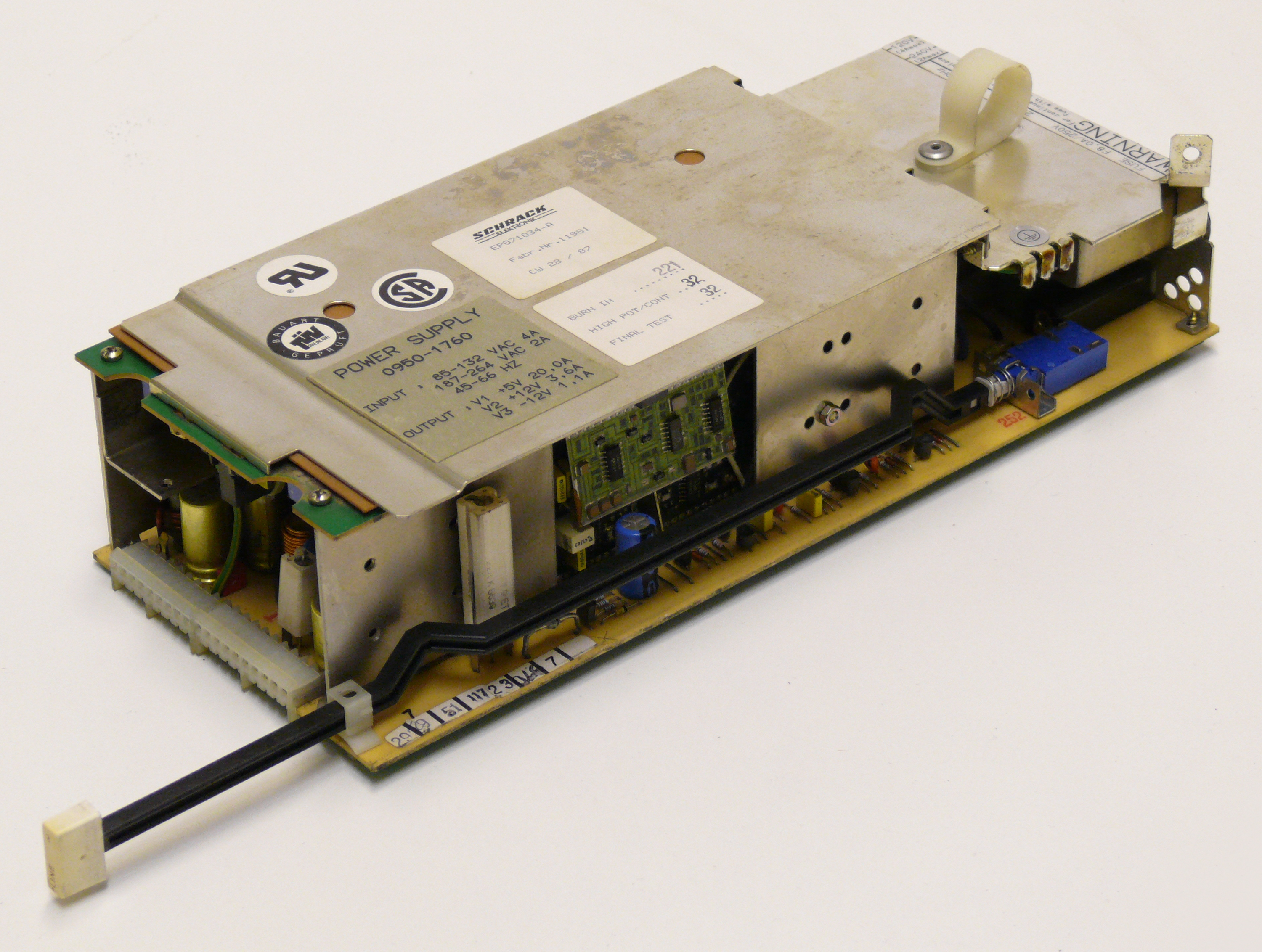
Power supply unit from a 1980s Hewlett-Packard workstation computer, with burn-in checkpoint from the factory marked in the sticker at center

Burn-in is the process by which components of a system are exercised before being placed in service (and often, before the system being completely assembled from those components). This testing process will force certain failures to occur under supervised conditions so an understanding of load capacity of the product can be established.

The intention is to detect those particular components that would fail as a result of the initial, high-failure rate portion of the bathtub curve of component reliability. If the burn-in period is made sufficiently long (and, perhaps, artificially stressful), the system can then be trusted to be mostly free of further early failures once the burn-in process is complete.

Theoretically, any weak components would fail during the burn-in time allowing those parts to be replaced. Replacing the weak components would prevent premature failure, infant mortality failure, or other latent defects.

When the equivalent lifetime of the stress is extended into the increasing part of the bathtub-like failure-rate curve, the effect of the burn-in is a reduction of product lifetime. In a mature production it is not easy to determine whether there is a decreasing failure rate. To determine the failure time distribution for a very low percentage of the production, one would have to destroy a very large number of devices. By stressing all devices for a certain burn-in time the devices with the highest failure rate fail first and can be taken out of the cohort. Thus by applying a burn-in, early in-use system failures can be avoided at the expense (tradeoff) of a reduced yield caused by the burn-in process.

When possible, it is better to eliminate the root cause of early failures than doing a burn-in. Because of this, a process that initially uses burn-in may eventually phase it out as the various root causes for failures are identified and eliminated.

For electronic components, burn-in is frequently conducted at elevated temperature and perhaps elevated voltage. This process may also be called heat soaking. The components may be under continuous test or simply tested at the end of the burn-in period.

There is another use of the term by some audiophiles, who leave new audio equipment turned on for multiple days or weeks, to get the components to achieve optimal performance. However, many debates have arisen about the benefits of this practice.

== See also ==
- Burn-in oven
- Failure rate
- Reliability theory
- Survival analysis
- Dielectric withstand test
- Shakedown (testing)
