= Latensification =

Latensification, a portmanteau of latent and intensification, is the name given to uniformly post-exposing a photographic emulsion.

The benefits of latensification are applicable in astrophotography - capturing images of stars. Without latensification an image would come out with several visible stars and be a perfectly acceptable image. However, many areas of the image would contain 'sub-latent' images, or areas of emulsion which have not received sufficient light to be exposed enough to show up. If the film was post-exposed, the threshold point of exposure could be reduced, so these 'sub-latent' images could become visible. More simply, the stars which would normally be too dark to expose the film would now be sufficiently bright to expose correctly.

In general photography, this process is often referred to as post-exposure (not to be confused with pre-flashing which happens before and even during the exposure).
