= Annealing (materials science) =

Heat treatment that alters the properties of a material

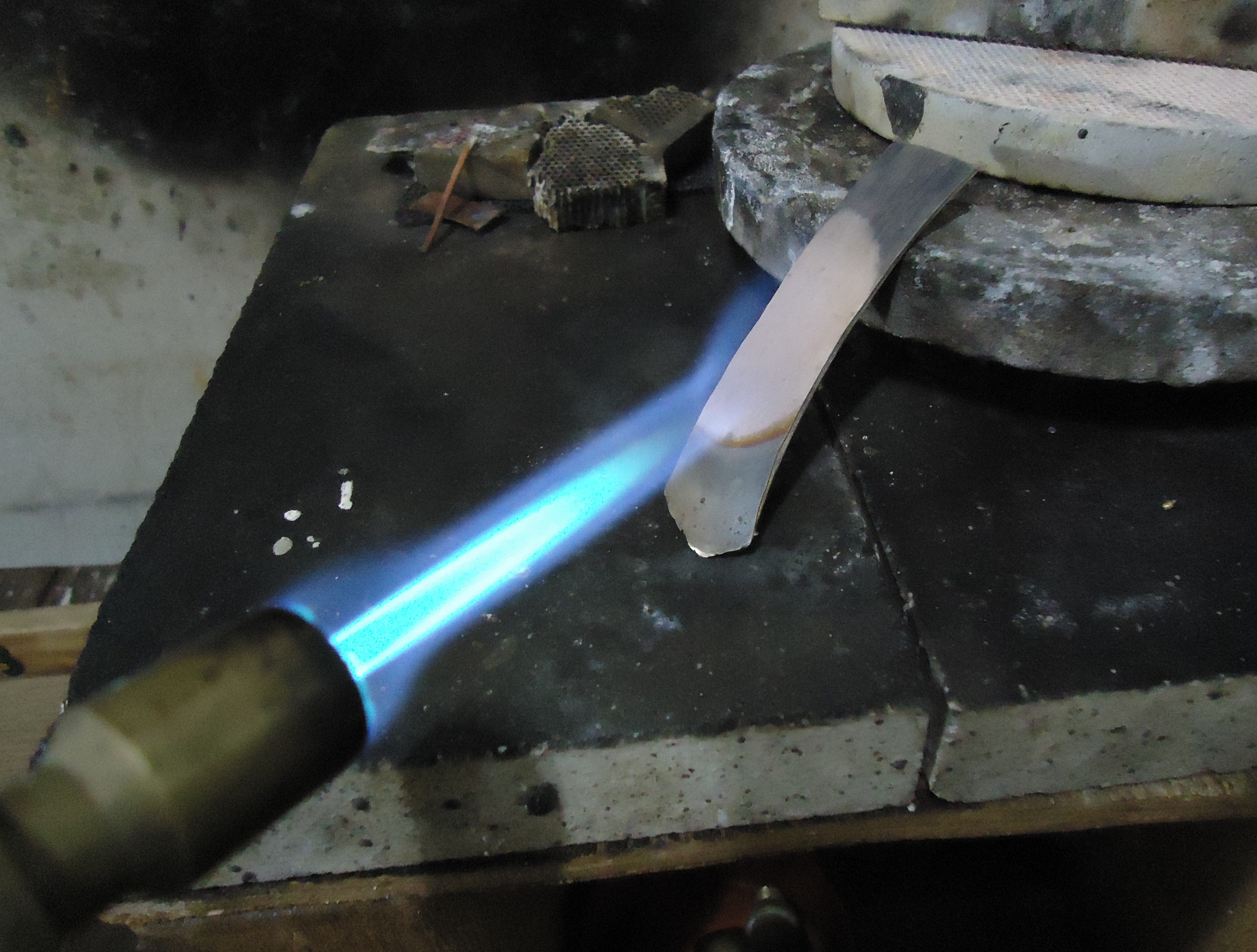
Annealing a silver strip

In metallurgy and materials science, annealing is a heat treatment that alters the physical and sometimes chemical properties of a material to increase its ductility and reduce its hardness, making it more workable. It involves heating a material above its recrystallization temperature, maintaining a suitable temperature for an appropriate amount of time, and then cooling.

In annealing, atoms migrate in the crystal lattice and the number of dislocations decreases, leading to a change in ductility and hardness. As the material cools it recrystallizes. For many alloys, including carbon steel, the crystal grain size and phase composition, which ultimately determine the material properties, are dependent on the heating rate and cooling rate. Hot working or cold working after the annealing process alters the metal structure, so further heat treatments may be used to achieve the properties required. With knowledge of the composition and phase diagram, heat treatment can be used to adjust from harder and more brittle to softer and more ductile.

In the case of ferrous metals, such as steel, annealing is performed by heating the material (generally until glowing) for a while and then slowly letting it cool to room temperature in still air. Copper, silver and brass can be either cooled slowly in air, or quickly by quenching in water. In this fashion, the metal is softened and prepared for further work such as shaping, stamping, or forming.

Many other materials, including glass and plastic films, use annealing to improve the finished properties.

== Thermodynamics ==
Annealing occurs by the diffusion of atoms within a solid material, so that the material progresses towards its equilibrium state. Heat increases the rate of diffusion by providing the energy needed to break bonds. The movement of atoms has the effect of redistributing and eradicating the dislocations in metals and (to a lesser extent) in ceramics. This alteration to existing dislocations allows a metal object to deform more easily, increasing its ductility.

The amount of process-initiating Gibbs free energy in a deformed metal is also reduced by the annealing process. In practice and industry, this reduction of Gibbs free energy is termed stress relief.

The relief of internal stresses is a thermodynamically spontaneous process; however, at room temperatures, it is a very slow process. The high temperatures at which annealing occurs serve to accelerate this process.

The reaction that facilitates returning the cold-worked metal to its stress-free state has many reaction pathways, mostly involving the elimination of lattice vacancy gradients within the body of the metal. The creation of lattice vacancies is governed by the Arrhenius equation, and the migration/diffusion of lattice vacancies are governed by Fick's laws of diffusion.

In steel, there is a decarburization mechanism that can be described as three distinct events: the reaction at the steel surface, the interstitial diffusion of carbon atoms and the dissolution of carbides within the steel.

=== Stages ===
The three stages of the annealing process that proceed as the temperature of the material is increased are: recovery, recrystallization, and grain growth. The first stage is recovery, and it results in softening of the metal through removal of primarily linear defects called dislocations and the internal stresses they cause. Recovery occurs at the lower temperature stage of all annealing processes and before the appearance of new strain-free grains. The grain size and shape do not change. The second stage is recrystallization, where new strain-free grains nucleate and grow to replace those deformed by internal stresses. If annealing is allowed to continue once recrystallization has completed, then grain growth (the third stage) occurs. In grain growth, the microstructure starts to coarsen and may cause the metal to lose a substantial part of its original strength. This can however be regained with hardening.

== Controlled atmospheres ==
The high temperature of annealing may result in oxidation of the metal's surface, resulting in scale. If scale must be avoided, annealing is carried out in a special atmosphere, such as with endothermic gas (a mixture of carbon monoxide, hydrogen gas, and nitrogen gas). Annealing is also done in forming gas, a mixture of hydrogen and nitrogen.

The magnetic properties of mu-metal are introduced by annealing the alloy in a hydrogen atmosphere.

== Setup and equipment ==
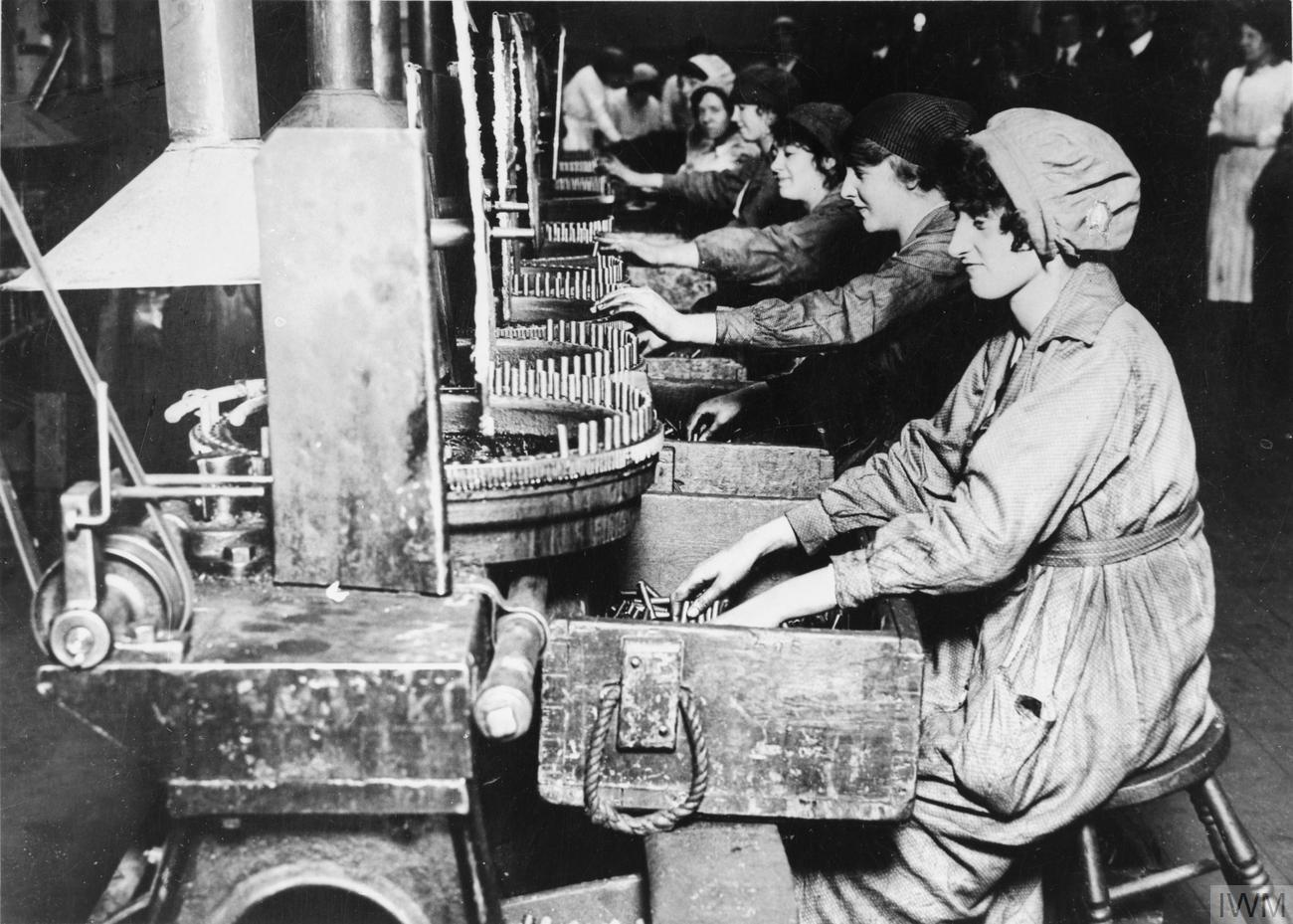
Workers annealing brass cartridge casings during World War I. The casings are placed onto revolving machines which pass them through a flame at the back, which relieves residual stress in the brass and prevents season cracking.

Typically, large ovens are used for the annealing process. The inside of the oven is large enough to place the workpiece in a position to receive maximum exposure to the circulating heated air. For high volume process annealing, gas fired conveyor furnaces are often used. For large workpieces or high quantity parts, car-bottom furnaces are used so workers can easily move the parts in and out. Once the annealing process is successfully completed, workpieces are sometimes left in the oven so the parts cool in a controllable way. While some workpieces are left in the oven to cool in a controlled fashion, other materials and alloys are removed from the oven. Once removed from the oven, the workpieces are often quickly cooled off in a process known as quench hardening. Typical methods of quench hardening materials involve media such as air, water, oil, or salt. Salt is used as a medium for quenching usually in the form of brine (salt water). Brine provides faster cooling rates than water. This is because when an object is quenched in water steam bubbles form on the surface of the object reducing the surface area the water is in contact with. The salt in the brine reduces the formation of steam bubbles on the object's surface, meaning there is a larger surface area of the object in contact with the water, thus facilitating better conduction of heat from the object to the surrounding water. Quench hardening is generally applicable to some ferrous alloys, but not copper alloys.

== Diffusion annealing of semiconductors ==
In the semiconductor industry, silicon wafers are annealed to repair atomic level disorder from steps like ion implantation. In the process step, dopant atoms, usually boron, phosphorus or arsenic, move into substitutional positions in the crystal lattice, which allows these dopant atoms to function properly as dopants in the semiconducting material.

== Specialized cycles ==
=== Normalization ===
Normalization is an annealing process applied to ferrous alloys to give the material a uniform fine-grained structure and to avoid excess softening in steel. It involves heating the steel to 20–50 °C above its upper critical point, soaking it for a short period at that temperature and then allowing it to cool in air. Heating the steel just above its upper critical point creates austenitic grains (much smaller than the previous ferritic grains), which during cooling, form new ferritic grains with a further refined grain size. The process produces a tougher, more ductile material, and eliminates columnar grains and dendritic segregation that sometimes occurs during casting. Normalizing improves machinability of a component and provides dimensional stability if subjected to further heat treatment processes.

=== Process annealing ===
Process annealing, also called intermediate annealing, subcritical annealing, or in-process annealing, is a heat treatment cycle that restores some of the ductility to a product being cold-worked so it can be cold-worked further without breaking.

The temperature range for process annealing ranges from 260 °C (500 °F) to 760 °C (1400 °F), depending on the alloy in question. This process is mainly suited for low-carbon steel. The material is heated up to a temperature just below the lower critical temperature of steel. Cold-worked steel normally tends to possess increased hardness and decreased ductility, making it difficult to work. Process annealing tends to improve these characteristics. This is mainly carried out on cold-rolled steel like wire-drawn steel, centrifugally cast ductile iron pipe etc.

=== Full annealing ===
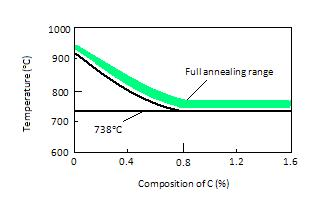
Full annealing temperature ranges

A full annealing typically results in the second most ductile state a metal can assume for metal alloy. Its purpose is to originate a uniform and stable microstructure that most closely resembles the metal's phase diagram equilibrium microstructure, thus letting the metal attain relatively low levels of hardness, yield strength and ultimate strength with high plasticity and toughness. To perform a full anneal on a steel for example, steel is heated to slightly above the austenitic temperature and held for sufficient time to allow the material to fully form austenite or austenite-cementite grain structure. The material is then allowed to cool very slowly so that the equilibrium microstructure is obtained. In most cases this means the material is allowed to furnace cool (the furnace is turned off and the steel is let cool down inside) but in some cases it is air cooled. The cooling rate of the steel has to be sufficiently slow so as to not let the austenite transform into bainite or martensite, but rather have it completely transform to pearlite and ferrite or cementite. This means that steels that are very hardenable (i.e. tend to form martensite under moderately low cooling rates) have to be furnace cooled. The details of the process depend on the type of metal and the precise alloy involved. In any case the result is a more ductile material but a lower yield strength and a lower tensile strength. This process is also called LP annealing for lamellar pearlite in the steel industry as opposed to a process anneal, which does not specify a microstructure and only has the goal of softening the material. Often the material to be machined is annealed, and then subject to further heat treatment to achieve the final desired properties.

=== Short cycle anneal ===
Short cycle annealing is used for turning normal ferrite into malleable ferrite. It consists of heating, cooling and then heating again from 4 to 8 hours.

== Resistive heating ==
Resistive heating can be used to efficiently anneal copper wire; the heating system employs a controlled electrical short circuit. It can be advantageous because it does not require a temperature-regulated furnace like other methods of annealing.

The process consists of two conductive pulleys (step pulleys), which the wire passes across after it is drawn. The two pulleys have an electrical potential across them, which causes the wire to form a short circuit. The Joule effect causes the temperature of the wire to rise to approximately 400 °C. This temperature is affected by the rotational speed of the pulleys, the ambient temperature, and the voltage applied. Where t is the temperature of the wire, K is a constant, V is the voltage applied, r is the number of rotations of the pulleys per minute, and t_{a} is the ambient temperature,

$$t = \frac{1}{r} KV^2 + t_a$$

The constant K depends on the diameter of the pulleys and the resistivity of the copper.

Purely in terms of the temperature of the copper wire, an increase in the speed of the wire through the pulley system has the same effect as a decrease in resistance.

== See also ==
- Annealing (glass)
- Annealing by short circuit
- Hollomon–Jaffe parameter
- Low hydrogen annealing
- Simulated annealing
- Tempering (metallurgy)
- Work hardening
