= Pre-flashing =

In cinematography and photography, pre-flashing is the exposure of the film or other photosensor to uniform light prior to exposing it to the scene to be imaged. This adds a bias to the overall light input recorded by the sensor.

It is sometimes used for artistic effects, as it can be used to add a colour cast to shadows without significantly affecting highlights.

It is also used in fields such as astronomy to bias CCD image sensors into a linear region, improving their low-light sensitivity.

== See also ==
- Photographic hypersensitization
- Pre-flash metering
