= Laboratory oven =

Laboratory ovens are a common piece of equipment that can be found in electronics, materials processing, forensic, and research laboratories. These ovens generally provide pinpoint temperature control and uniform temperatures throughout the heating process. The following applications are some of the common uses for laboratory ovens: annealing, die-bond curing, drying or dehydrating, Polyimide baking, sterilizing, evaporating. Typical sizes are from one cubic foot to 0.9 cubic metres (32 cu ft). Some ovens can reach temperatures that are higher than 300 degrees Celsius. These temperatures are then applied from all sides of the oven to provide constant heat to sample.

Laboratory ovens can be used in numerous different applications and configurations, including clean rooms, forced convection, horizontal airflow, inert atmosphere, natural convection, and pass through.

There are many types of laboratory ovens that are used throughout laboratories. Standard digital ovens are mainly used for drying and heating processes while providing temperature control and safety. Heavy duty ovens are used more in the industrial laboratories and provide testing and drying for biological samples. High temperature ovens are custom built and have additional insulation lining. This is needed for the oven due to its high temperatures that can reach up to 500 degrees Celsius. Other forms of the laboratory oven include vacuum ovens, forced air convection ovens, and gravity convection ovens.

Forensic labs use vacuum ovens that have been configured in specific ways to assist in developing fingerprints. Gravity convection ovens are used for biological purposes such as removing biological contaminants from samples. Along with forced-air ovens, they are also used in environmental studies to dry out samples that have been taken. These samples are weighed before and after to calculate the amount of moisture in the sample.

== Laboratory oven safety ==
Laboratory ovens contain many components and other procedures that can be harmful to the user. Proper procedure and safety can help lead to mitigating the amount of injuries and oven malfunctions when using laboratory ovens. Before the oven is used, check to make sure that the oven is still in good working condition. All temperature sensing devices need be operational and should shut off the oven if temperatures exceed there limits. If the oven is not operational, it must be unplugged and labeled with the statement "Defective Equipment" on the surface of the oven.

Potential hazards that can be faced when using the laboratory ovens are fire hazards, health hazards, and burn hazards. Using plastic materials that can't withstand the temperatures of the oven will melt and ignite. This can cause a fire to start in the oven and room. Checking materials before continuing with experiments will help prevent potential fires. If some items are placed in the oven and haven't been cleaned properly, the heat will cause the residue of past experiments to become airborne. Properly cleaning and washing material before use is a great way to remove this hazard. Avoid touching hot surfaces on the oven when it is being used. Not doing so will result in the user being severely burned. The equipment needed while using the oven includes the following: lab coat, eye/face protection, heat resistant gloves. Rubber sleeve protectors and aprons will also be helpful in using the ovens. If the proper safety guidelines and equipment are used, the lower the chance of problems are to occur.
