= Industrial oven =

Heated chamber used in industry

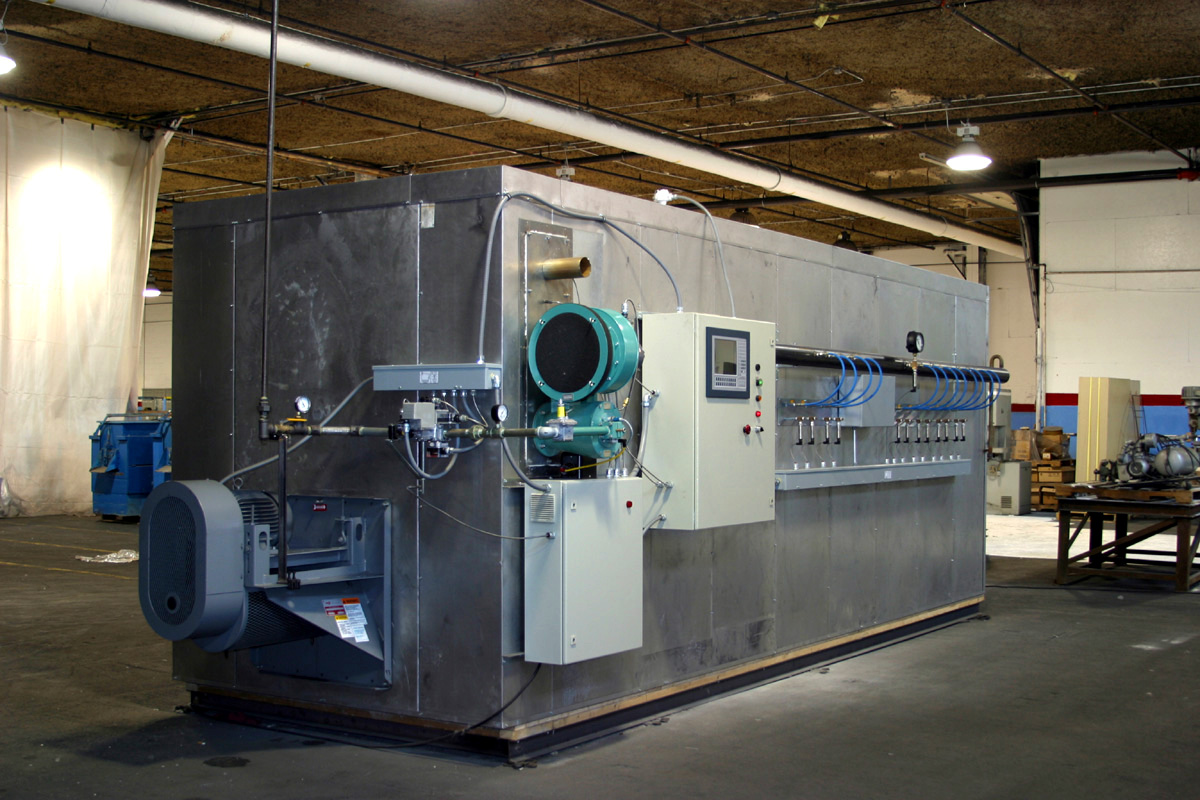
Industrial convection oven used in the manufacture of aircraft components. Heating is by gas-fired heat exchanger; fully automated control system holds air temperature within 2°F.

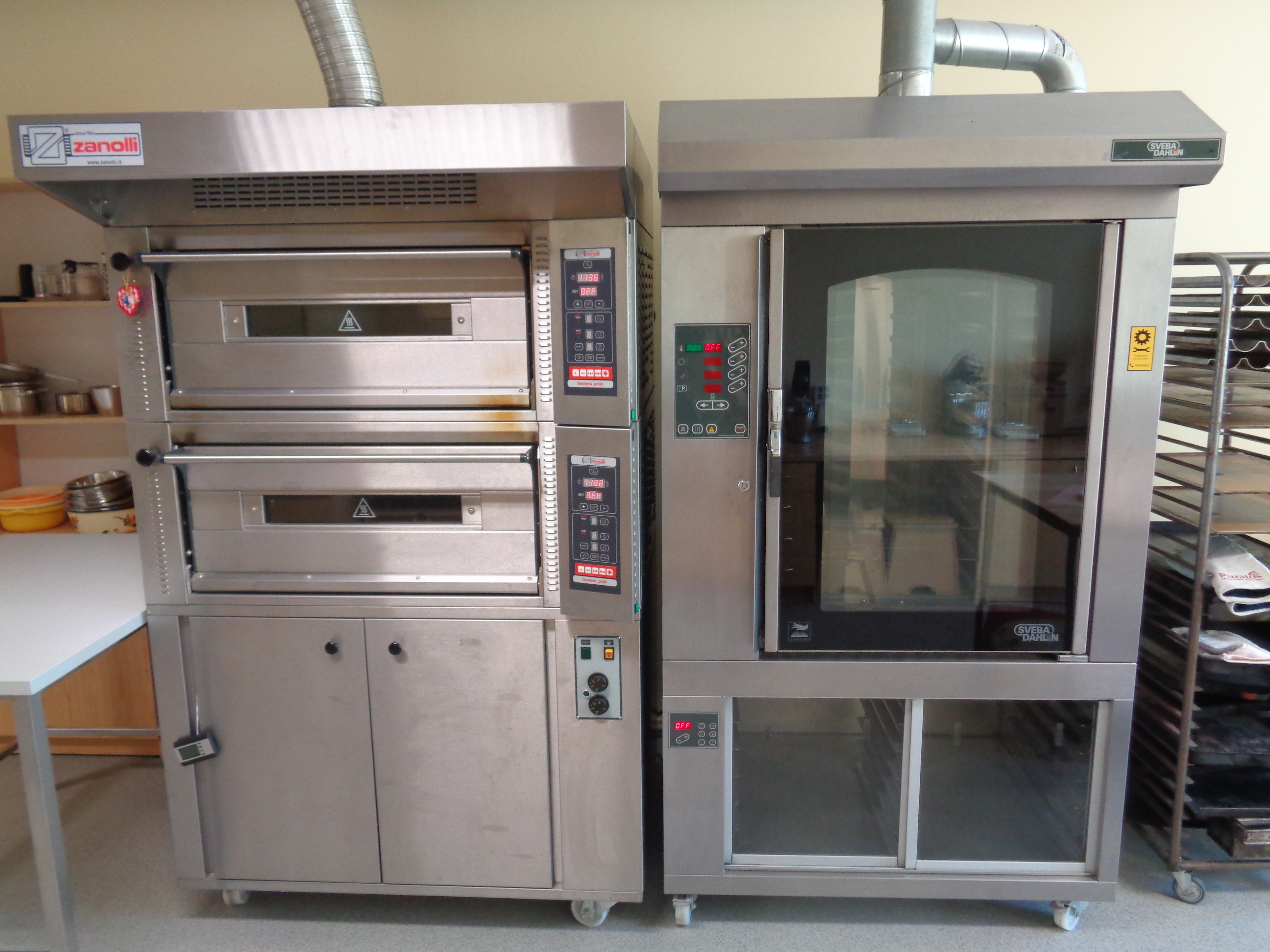
Industrial Zanolli double hearth deck oven (left) and Sveba-Dahlen rotary rack oven (right)

Industrial ovens are heated chambers used for a variety of industrial applications, including drying, curing, or baking components, parts or final products. Industrial ovens can be used for large or small volume applications, in batches or continuously with a conveyor line, and a variety of temperature ranges, sizes and configurations.

Such ovens are used in many different applications, including chemical processing, food production, and even in the electronics industry, where circuit boards are run through a conveyor oven to attach surface mount components.

Some common types of industrial ovens include:

- Curing ovens – Designed to cause a chemical reaction in a substance once a specific temperature is reached. Powder coating is one common curing oven use.
- Drying ovens – Designed to remove moisture. Typical applications are pre-treating and painting. Such ovens are also sometimes known as kilns, though they do not reach the same high temperatures as are used in ceramic kilns.
- Baking ovens – Combines the function of curing and drying ovens.
- Reflow Ovens – A reflow oven is a machine used primarily for reflow soldering of surface mount electronic components to printed circuit boards (PCB).
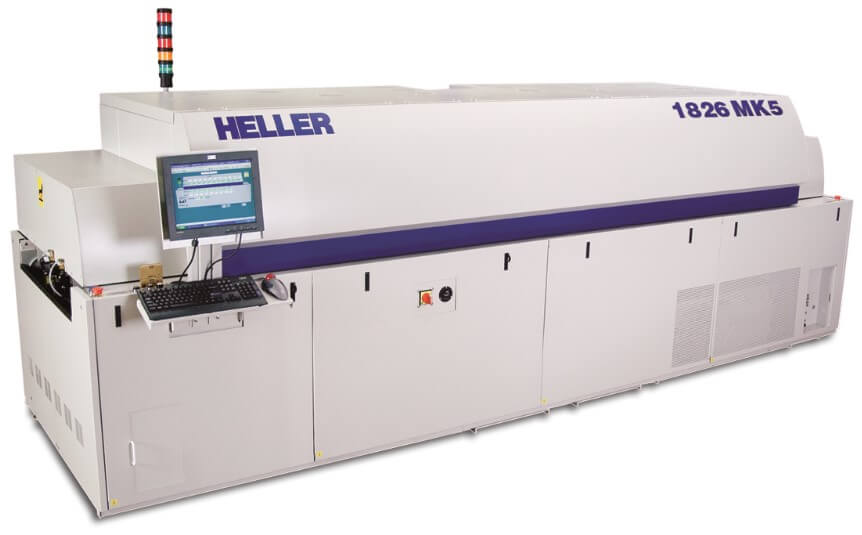
  A graphical example of a convection reflow oven.
  The oven contains multiple zones, which can be individually controlled for temperature. Generally, there are several heating zones followed by one or more cooling zones. The PCB moves through the oven on a conveyor belt, and is therefore subjected to a controlled time-temperature profile.
- Batch ovens – Also called cabinet or Walk-in/Truck-in ovens, batch ovens allow for curing, drying or baking in small batches using wheeled racks, carts or trucks. Ovens such as this are often found in large-volume bakeries in places such as supermarkets.
- Conveyor or Continuous Ovens – Typically part of an automated conveyor processing line, conveyor ovens allow for higher volume processing. Heat tunnels are an example.
- Clean room ovens – Designed for applications requiring a cleanroom, such as a semiconductor manufacturing or biotechnology processes.

== See also ==
- Chandley Ovens
- Gradient oven tester
- Industrial furnace
- List of ovens
