= Astrophotography =

Imaging of astronomical objects

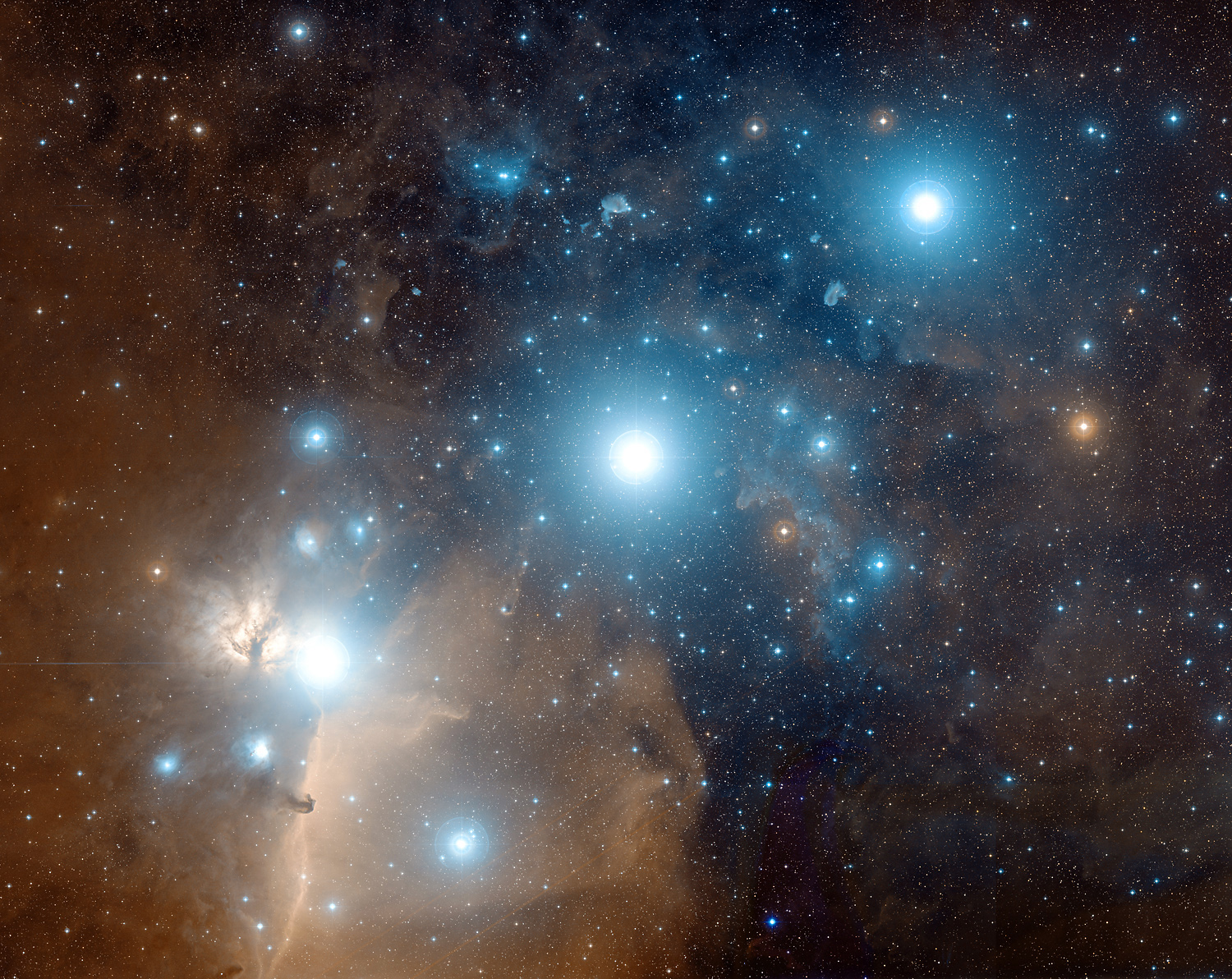
An image of Orion's Belt composited from digitized black-and-white photographic plates recorded through red and blue astronomical filters, with a computer synthesized green channel. The plates were taken using the Samuel Oschin Telescope between 1987 and 1991.

Astrophotography, also known as astronomical imaging, is the photography or imaging of astronomical objects, celestial events, or areas of the night sky. The first photograph of an astronomical object (the Moon) was taken in 1839, but it was not until the late 19th century that advances in technology allowed for detailed stellar photography. Besides being able to record the details of extended objects such as the Moon, Sun, and planets, modern astrophotography has the ability to image objects outside of the visible spectrum of the human eye such as dim stars, nebulae, and galaxies. This is accomplished through long time exposure as both film and digital cameras can accumulate and sum photons over long periods of time or using specialized optical filters which limit the photons to a certain wavelength.

Photography using extended exposure-times revolutionized the field of professional astronomical research, recording hundreds of thousands of new stars, and nebulae invisible to the human eye. Specialized and ever-larger optical telescopes were constructed as essentially big cameras to record images on photographic plates. Astrophotography had an early role in sky surveys and star classification but over time it has used ever more sophisticated image sensors and other equipment and techniques designed for specific fields.

Since almost all observational astronomy today uses photography, the term "astrophotography" usually refers to its use in amateur astronomy, seeking aesthetically pleasing images rather than scientific data. Amateurs use a wide range of special equipment and techniques.

== Methods ==
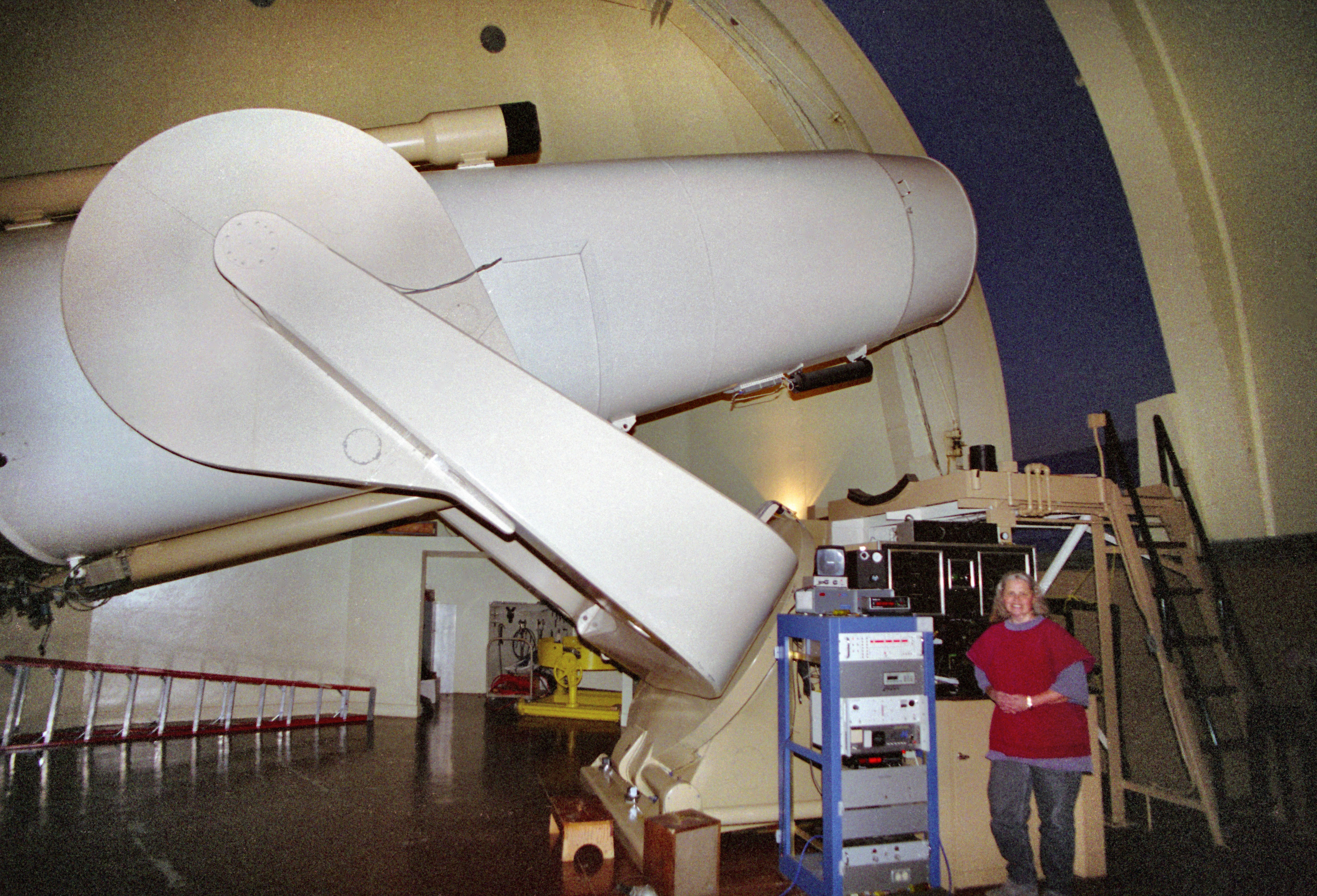
The large 48" Oschin Schmidt camera at Palomar Observatory

With a few exceptions, astronomical photography employs long exposures since both film and digital imaging devices can accumulate light photons over long periods of time. The amount of light hitting the film or detector is also increased by increasing the diameter of the primary optics (the objective) being used. Urban areas produce light pollution so equipment and observatories doing astronomical imaging are often located in remote locations to allow long exposures without the film or detectors being swamped with stray light.

This amateur astrophotography setup is controlled by an onboard computer which is wirelessly connected to a laptop (out of frame). After taking frames for a mosaic of the Pleiades, the mount briefly returns to its home position, awaiting further instructions, before imaging another mosaic of the Orion Nebula.

Since the Earth is constantly rotating, telescopes and equipment are rotated in the opposite direction to follow the apparent motion of the stars overhead (called diurnal motion). This is accomplished by using either equatorial or computer-controlled altazimuth telescope mounts to keep celestial objects centered while Earth rotates. All telescope mount systems suffer from induced tracking errors due to imperfect motor drives, the mechanical sag of the telescope, and atmospheric refraction. Tracking errors are corrected by keeping a selected aiming point, usually a guide star, centered during the entire exposure. Sometimes (as in the case of comets) the object to be imaged is moving, so the telescope has to be kept constantly centered on that object. Star guiding is done through a second co-mounted telescope called a guide scope, or via an off-axis guider, a device with a prism or optical beam splitter that allows the observer to view the same image in the telescope that is taking the picture. Guiding was formerly done manually throughout the exposure with an observer standing at (or riding inside) the telescope making corrections to keep a cross hair on the guide star. Since the advent of computer-controlled systems, this is accomplished by an automated system in professional and even amateur equipment.

Astronomical photography was one of the earliest types of scientific photography and almost from its inception it diversified into subdisciplines that each have a specific goal including star cartography, astrometry, stellar classification, photometry and spectroscopy, polarimetry, and the discovery of astronomical objects such as asteroids, meteors, comets, variable stars, novae, and even unknown planets. These often require specialized equipment such as telescopes designed for precise imaging, for wide field of view (such as Schmidt cameras), or for work at specific wavelengths of light. Astronomical CCD cameras may cool the sensor to reduce thermal noise and to allow the detector to record images in other spectra such as in infrared astronomy. Specialized filters are also used to record images in specific wavelengths.

== History ==
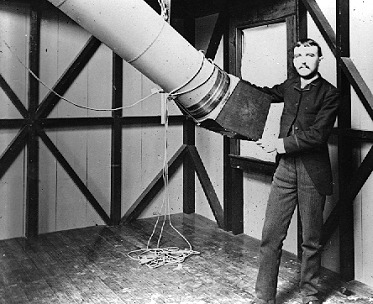
Henry Draper with a refractor telescope set up for photography (photo probably taken in the 1860s or early 1870).

The development of astrophotography as a scientific tool was pioneered in the mid-19th century for the most part by experimenters and amateur astronomers, or so-called "gentleman scientists" (although, as in other scientific fields, these were not always men). Because of the very long exposures needed to capture relatively faint astronomical objects, many technological problems had to be overcome. These included making telescopes rigid enough so they would not sag out of focus during the exposure, building clock drives that could rotate the telescope mount at a constant rate, and developing ways to accurately keep a telescope aimed at a fixed point over a long period of time. Early photographic processes also had limitations. The daguerreotype process was far too slow to record anything but the brightest objects, and the wet plate collodion process limited exposures to the time the plate could stay wet.

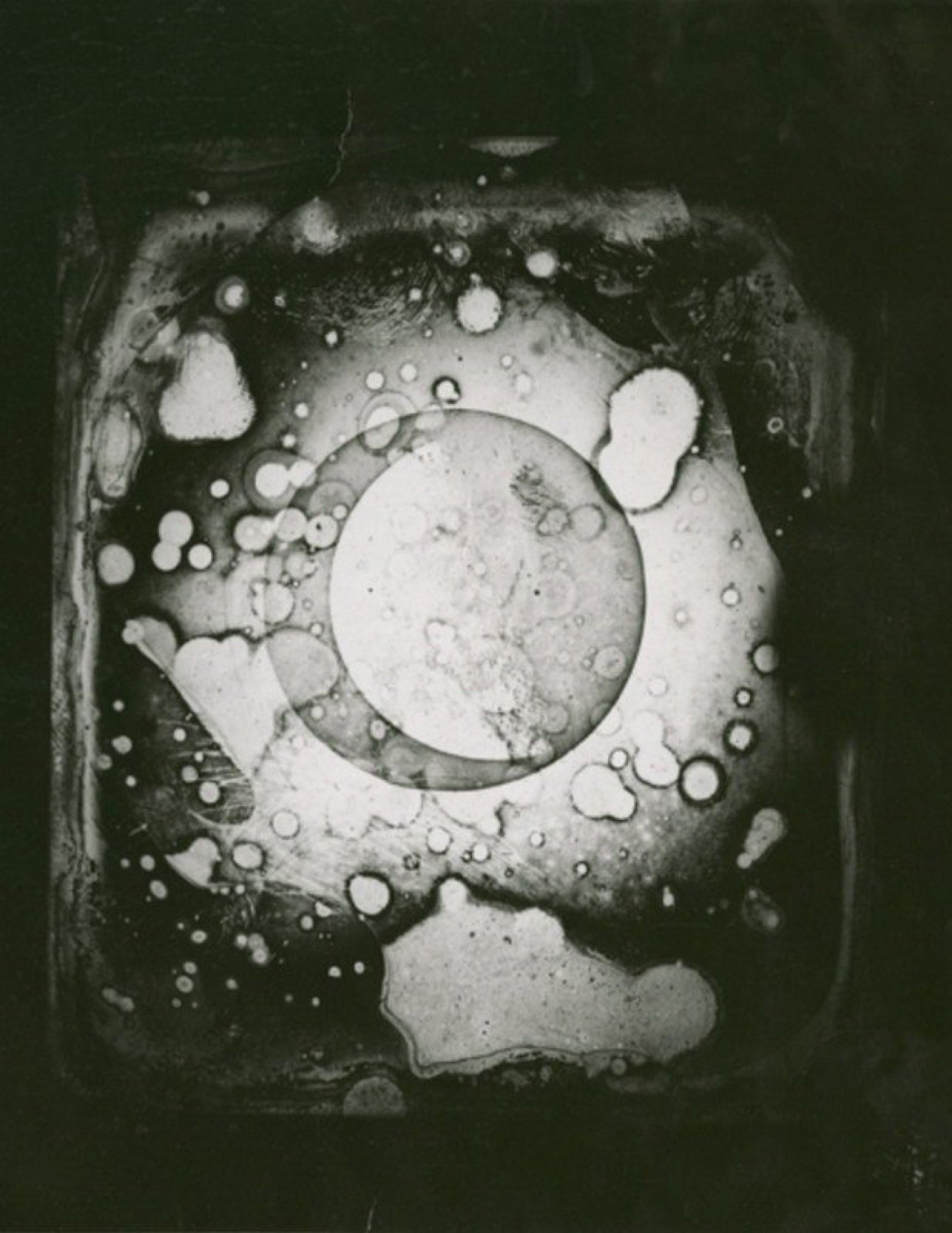
The earliest surviving daguerrotype of the Moon by Draper (1840)

The first known attempt at astronomical photography was by Louis Jacques Mandé Daguerre, inventor of the daguerreotype process which bears his name, who attempted in 1839 to photograph the Moon. Tracking errors in guiding the telescope during the long exposure meant the photograph came out as an indistinct fuzzy spot. John William Draper, New York University professor of chemistry, physician and scientific experimenter managed to make the first successful photograph of the Moon a year later on 23 March 1840, taking a 20-minute-long daguerreotype image using a 5-inch (13 cm) reflecting telescope.

The Sun was first photographed in an 1845 daguerreotype by the French physicists Léon Foucault and Hippolyte Fizeau. A failed attempt to obtain a photograph of a total eclipse of the Sun was made by the Italian physicist, Gian Alessandro Majocchi during an eclipse of the Sun that took place in his home city of Milan, on 8 July 1842. He later gave an account of his attempt and the Daguerreotype photographs he obtained, in which he wrote:

A few minutes before and after totality an iodized plate was exposed in a camera to the light of the thin crescent, and a distinct image was obtained, but another plate exposed to the light of the corona for two minutes during totality did not show the slightest trace of photographic action. No photographic alteration was caused by the light of the corona condensed by a lens for two minutes, during totality, on a sheet of paper prepared with bromide of silver.

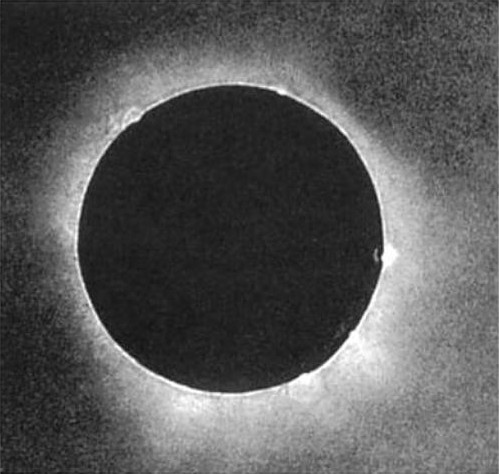
The first solar eclipse photograph was taken on 28 July 1851, by a daguerrotypist named Berkowski.

The Sun's solar corona was first successfully imaged during the solar eclipse of July 28, 1851. August Ludwig Busch, the director of the Königsberg Observatory gave instructions for a local daguerreotypist named Johann Julius Friedrich Berkowski to image the eclipse. Busch himself was not present at Königsberg (now Kaliningrad, Russia), but preferred to observe the eclipse from nearby Rixhoft. The telescope used by Berkowski was attached to 6 1/2-inch (17 cm) Königsberg heliometer and had an aperture of only 2.4 in (6.1 cm), and a focal length of 32 in (81 cm). Commencing immediately after the beginning of totality, Berkowski exposed a daguerreotype plate for 84 seconds in the focus of the telescope, and on developing an image of the corona was obtained. He also exposed a second plate for about 40 to 45 seconds but was spoiled when the Sun broke out from behind the Moon. More detailed photographic studies of the Sun were made by the British astronomer Warren De la Rue starting in 1861.

The first photograph of a star other than the Sun was a daguerreotype of the star Vega by astronomer William Cranch Bond and daguerreotype photographer and experimenter John Adams Whipple, on 16 and 17 July 1850 with Harvard College Observatory's 15 inch great refractor. In 1863, the English chemist William Allen Miller and English amateur astronomer Sir William Huggins used the wet collodion plate process to obtain the first ever photographic spectrogram of a star, Sirius and Capella. In 1872 American physician Henry Draper, the son of John William Draper, recorded the first spectrogram of a star (Vega) to show absorption lines.

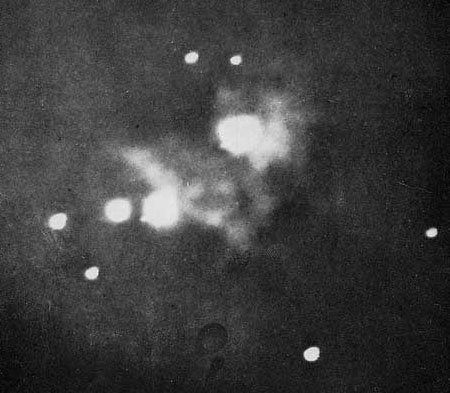
Henry Draper's 1880 photograph of the Orion Nebula, the first ever taken.

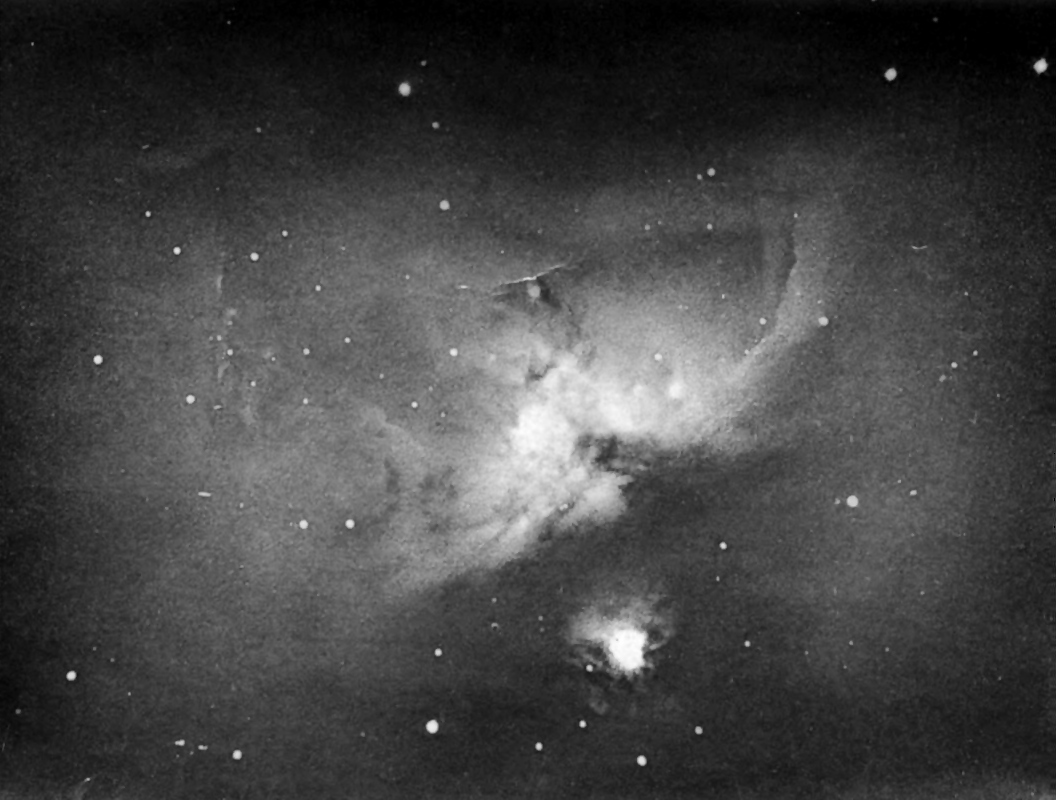
One of Andrew Ainslie Common's 1883 photographs of the same nebula, the first to show that a long exposure could record stars and nebulae invisible to the human eye.

Astronomical photography did not become a serious research tool until the late 19th century, with the introduction of dry plate photography. It was first used by Sir William Huggins and his wife Margaret Lindsay Huggins, in 1876, in their work to record the spectra of astronomical objects. In 1880, Henry Draper used the new dry plate process with photographically corrected 11 in (28 cm) refracting telescope made by Alvan Clark to make a 51-minute exposure of the Orion Nebula, the first photograph of a nebula ever made. A breakthrough in astronomical photography came in 1883, when amateur astronomer Andrew Ainslie Common used the dry plate process to record several images of the same nebula in exposures up to 60 minutes with a 36 in (91 cm) reflecting telescope that he constructed in the backyard of his home in Ealing, outside London. These images for the first time showed stars too faint to be seen by the human eye.

The first all-sky photographic astrometry project, Astrographic Catalogue and Carte du Ciel, was started in 1887. It was conducted by 18 observatories all using special photographic telescopes with a uniform design called normal astrographs, all with an aperture of around 13 in (330 mm) and a focal length of 11 ft (3.4 m), designed to create images with a uniform scale on the photographic plate of approximately 60 arcsecs/mm while covering a 2° × 2° field of view. The attempt was to accurately map the sky down to the 14th magnitude but it was never completed.

The beginning of the 20th century saw the worldwide construction of refracting telescopes and sophisticated large reflecting telescopes specifically designed for photographic imaging. Towards the middle of the century, giant telescopes such as the 200 in (5.1 m) Hale Telescope and the 48 in (120 cm) Samuel Oschin telescope at Palomar Observatory were pushing the limits of film photography.

Some progress was made in the field of photographic emulsions and in the techniques of forming gas hypersensitization, cryogenic cooling, and light amplification, but starting in the 1970s after the invention of the CCD, photographic plates were gradually replaced by electronic imaging. CCDs are far more light sensitive, have the ability to record in a much wider spectral range, do not drop off in sensitivity over long exposures the way film does ("reciprocity failure"), and can store information electronically. Telescopes now use many configurations of CCD sensors, including linear arrays and mosaics of CCD elements.

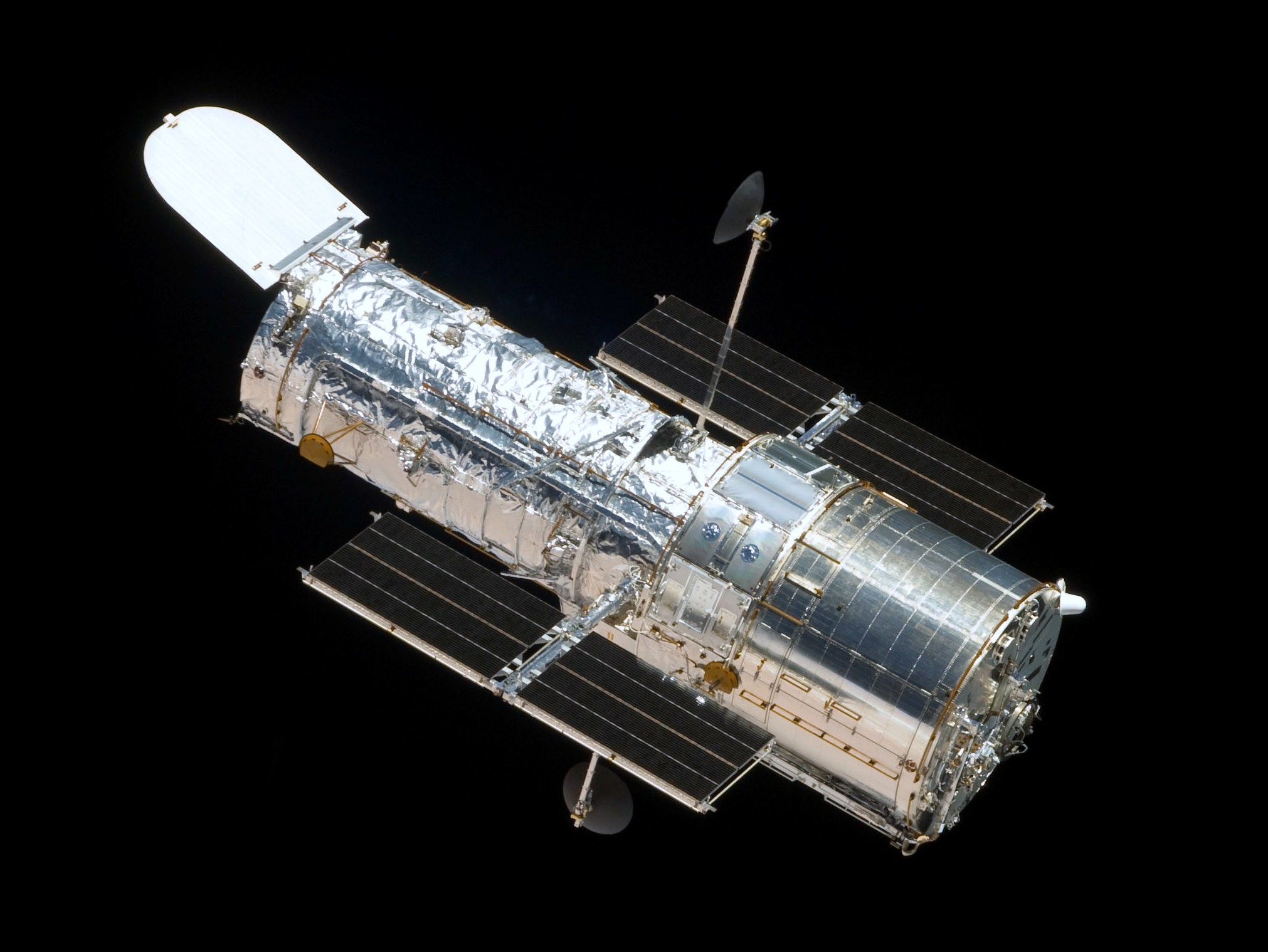
The Hubble Space Telescope shortly after the STS-125 maintenance mission in 2009.

The late 20th century saw advances in astronomical imaging take place in the form of new hardware, with the construction of giant multi-mirror and segmented mirror telescopes. It would also see the introduction of space-based telescopes, such as the Hubble Space Telescope. Operating outside the atmosphere's turbulence allows the Hubble Space Telescope, with a mirror diameter of 2.4 metres (94 in), to record stars down to the 31st magnitude, some 1,000 times dimmer than what the 5-meter Mount Palomar Hale Telescope could record in 1949.

== Amateur astrophotography ==
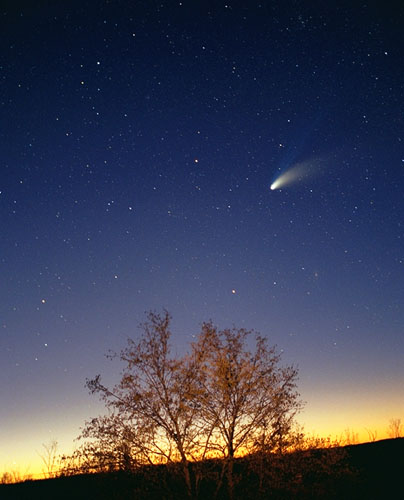
2 minute time exposure of Comet Hale–Bopp imaged using a camera on a fixed tripod. The tree in the foreground was illuminated using a small flashlight.

Astrophotography is a popular hobby among photographers and amateur astronomers. Techniques ranges from basic film and digital cameras on tripods up to methods and equipment geared toward advanced imaging. Amateur astronomers and amateur telescope makers also use homemade equipment and modified devices.

=== Media ===
Images can be recorded on many types of media and imaging devices including single-lens reflex cameras, 35 mm film, 120 film, digital single-lens reflex cameras, simple amateur-level, and professional-level commercially manufactured astronomical CCD and CMOS cameras, video cameras, and even off-the-shelf webcams used for lucky imaging.

The conventional over-the-counter film has long been used for astrophotography. Film exposures range from seconds to over an hour. Commercially available color film stock is subject to reciprocity failure over long exposures, in which sensitivity to light of different wavelengths appears to drop off at different rates as the exposure time increases, leading to a color shift in the image and reduced sensitivity over all as a function of time. This is compensated for, or at least reduced, by cooling the film (see Cold camera photography). This can also be compensated for by using the same technique used in professional astronomy of taking photographs at different wavelengths that are then combined to create a correct color image. Film astrophotography is becoming less popular due to the lower ongoing costs, greater sensitivity, and the convenience of digital photography.

Video of night sky made with a DSLR camera's time-lapse feature. The camera itself is moving in these shots on a motorized mount.

Since the early 1990s, amateurs have been following the professional observatories in the switch from film to digital CCDs for astronomical imaging. CCDs are more sensitive than film, allowing much shorter exposure times, and have a linear response to light. Images can be captured in many short exposures (called stacking) to create a synthetic long exposure. Digital cameras also have minimal or no moving parts and the ability to be operated remotely via an infrared remote or computer tethering, limiting vibration. Simple digital devices such as webcams can be modified to allow access to the focal plane and even be used for long exposure photography. There are many techniques and pieces of commercially manufactured equipment for attaching digital single-lens reflex (DSLR) cameras and even basic point and shoot cameras to telescopes. Consumer-level digital cameras suffer from image noise over long exposures, so there are many techniques for cooling the camera, including cryogenic cooling. Astronomical equipment companies also now offer a wide range of purpose-built astronomical CCD cameras complete with hardware and processing software. Many cameras have the ability to take long time exposures combined with sequential (time-lapse) images allowing the photographer to create a motion picture of the night sky.

CMOS cameras are increasingly replacing CCD cameras in the amateur sector. Modern CMOS sensors offer higher quantum efficiency, lower read noise, and faster readout speeds than commercially available CCD sensors. CMOS sensors have benefitted from developments such as microlensing to focus more light into photodiodes and a change in camera interfaces from USB 2.0 to USB 3.0 to vastly improve readout speeds. By stacking exposures from these sensors, autoguiding becomes less important or in some cases unnecessary, in exchange for increased storage and compute requirements.

==== Post-processing ====
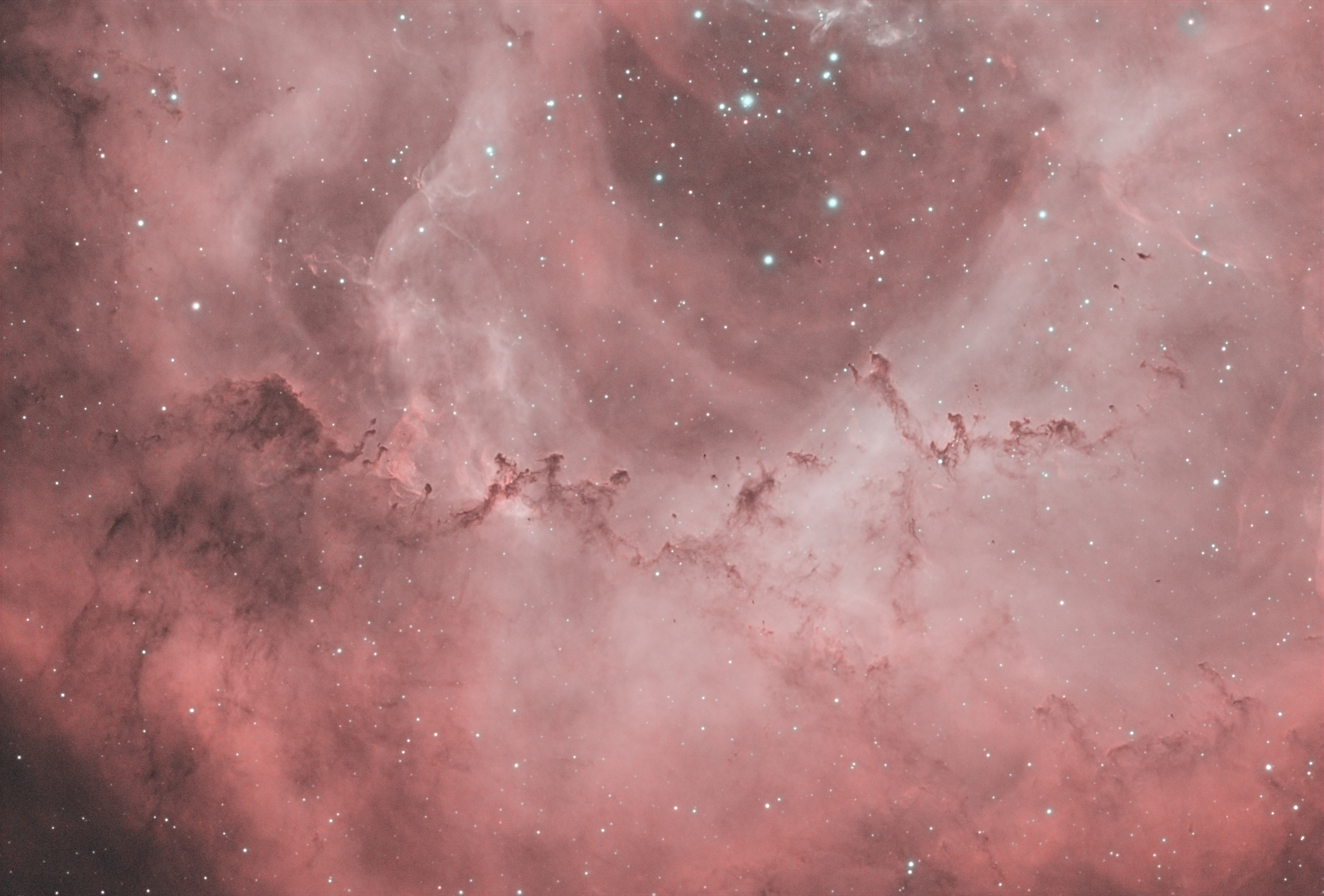
The Rosette Nebula, photographed through hydrogen and oxygen narrowband filters. Post processing included star alignment, averaging (stacking), curves to enhance details and adjust contrast, minor saturation and noise reduction, all done in PixInsight. No calibration frames used.

Both digital camera images and scanned film images are usually adjusted in image processing software to improve the image in some way. Images can be brightened and manipulated in a computer to adjust color and increase the contrast. More sophisticated techniques involve capturing multiple images (sometimes thousands) to composite together in an additive process to sharpen images to overcome atmospheric seeing, negating tracking issues, bringing out faint objects with a poor signal-to-noise ratio, and filtering out light pollution.

Digital camera images may also need further processing to reduce the image noise from long exposures, including subtracting a "dark frame" and a processing called image stacking or "Shift-and-add". Commercial, freeware and free software packages are available specifically for astronomical photographic image manipulation.

"Lucky imaging" is a secondary technique that involves taking a video of an object rather than standard long exposure photos. Software can then select the highest quality images which can then be stacked. This is typically used when observing planetary objects and helps to overcome atmospheric conditions.

==== Color and brightness ====
Astronomical pictures, like observational astronomy and photography from space exploration, show astronomical objects and phenomena in different colors and brightness, and often as composite images. This is done to highlight different features or reflect different conditions, and makes the note of these conditions necessary.

Images attempting to reproduce the true color and appearance of an astronomical object or phenomenon need to consider many factors, including how the human eye works. Particularly under different atmospheric conditions, images need to evaluate several factors to produce analyzable or representative images, like images of space missions from the surface of Mars, Venus or Titan.

=== Hardware ===
Astrophotographic hardware among non-professional astronomers varies widely since the photographers themselves range from general photographers shooting some form of aesthetically pleasing images to very serious amateur astronomers collecting data for scientific research. As a hobby, astrophotography has many challenges that have to be overcome that differ from conventional photography and from what is normally encountered in professional astronomy.

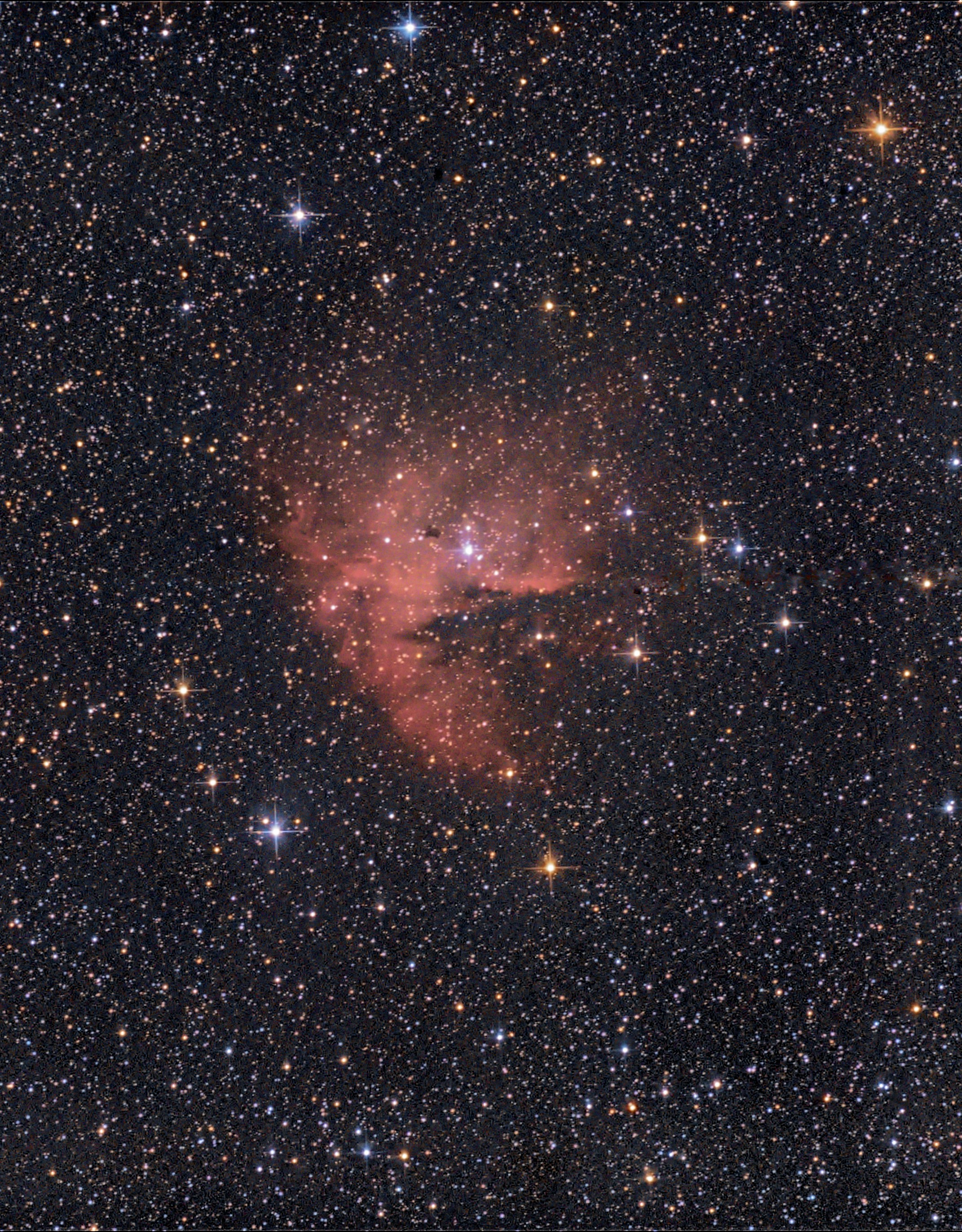
NGC281, popularly the 'Pacman Nebula', imaged from a suburban location using a 130mm amateur telescope and a DSLR camera.

Since most people live in urban areas, equipment often needs to be portable so that it can be taken far away from the lights of major cities or towns to avoid urban light pollution. Urban astrophotographers may use special light-pollution or narrow-band filters and computer processing techniques to reduce ambient urban light in the background of their images. They may also stick to imaging bright targets like the Sun, Moon and planets. Another method used by amateurs to avoid light pollution is to set up, or rent time, on a remotely operated telescope at a dark sky location. Other challenges include setup and alignment of portable telescopes for accurate tracking, working within the limitations of "off the shelf" equipment, the endurance of monitoring equipment, and sometimes manually tracking astronomical objects over long exposures in a wide range of weather conditions.

Some camera manufacturers modify their products to be used as astrophotography cameras, such as Canon's EOS 60Da, based on the EOS 60D but with a modified infrared filter and a low-noise sensor with heightened hydrogen-alpha sensitivity for improved capture of red hydrogen emission nebulae.

There are also cameras specifically designed for amateur astrophotography based on commercially available imaging sensors. They may also allow the sensor to be cooled to reduce thermal noise in long exposures, provide raw image readout, and to be controlled from a computer for automated imaging. Raw image readout allows later better image processing by retaining all the original image data which along with stacking can assist in imaging faint deep sky objects.

With very low light capability, a few specific models of webcams are popular for solar, lunar, and planetary imaging. Mostly, these are manually focused cameras containing a CCD sensor instead of the more common CMOS. The lenses of these cameras are removed and then these are attached to telescopes to record images, videos, or both. In newer techniques, videos of very faint objects are taken and the sharpest frames of the video are 'stacked' together to obtain a still image of respectable contrast. The Philips PCVC 740K and SPC 900 are among the few webcams liked by astrophotographers. Any smartphone that allows long exposures can be used for this purpose, but some phones have a specific mode for astrophotography that will stitch together multiple exposures.

==== Equipment setups ====
Fixed or tripod

The most basic types of astronomical photographs are made with standard cameras and photographic lenses mounted in a fixed position or on a tripod. Foreground objects or landscapes are sometimes composed in the shot. Objects imaged are constellations, interesting planetary configurations, meteors, and bright comets. Exposure times must be short (under 30 seconds) to avoid having the stars point image become an elongated line due to the Earth's rotation. Camera lens focal lengths are usually short, as longer lenses will show image trailing in a matter of seconds. A rule of thumb called the 500 rule states that, to keep stars point-like,

Maximum exposure time in seconds = 500/(Focal length in mm × Crop factor)

regardless of aperture or ISO setting. For example, with a 35 mm lens on an APS-C sensor, the maximum time is 500/(35 × 1.5) ≈ 9.5 s. A more accurate calculation takes into account pixel pitch and declination.

A more accurate rule of thumb is the NPF rule, which states that, to keep stars point-like,

Maximum exposure time in seconds = ((35 × aperture in f-stop + 30 × pixel pitch in μm))/(Focal length in mm)

assuming a declination of 60°. For example, for a Nikon D3300 APS-C camera with 3.91 μm pixel pitch and an 11 mm f/2.8 lens, the maximum time is ((35 × 2.8 + 30 × 3.91))/11 ≈ 19.6 s.

Allowing the stars to intentionally become elongated lines in exposures lasting several minutes or even hours, called "star trails", is an artistic technique that is sometimes used.

Tracking mounts

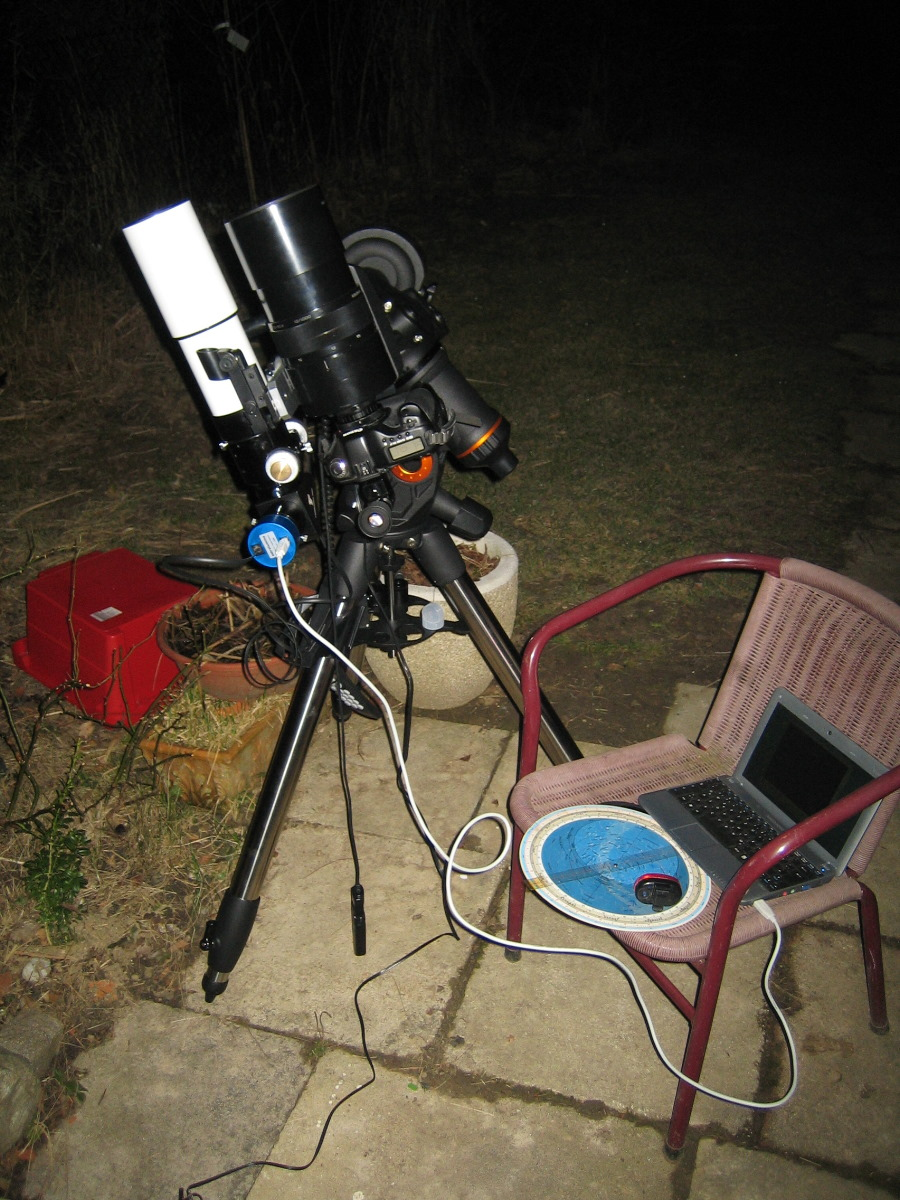
An astrophotography set up with an automated guide system connected to a laptop.

Telescope mounts that compensate for the Earth's rotation are used for longer exposures without objects being blurred. They include commercial equatorial mounts and homemade equatorial devices such as barn door trackers and equatorial platforms. Mounts can suffer from inaccuracies due to backlash in the gears, wind, and imperfect balance, and so a technique called auto guiding is used as a closed feedback system to correct for these inaccuracies.

Tracking mounts can come in two forms; single axis and dual axis. Single axis mounts are often known as star trackers. Star trackers have a single motor which drives the right ascension axis. This allows the mount to compensate for the Earth's rotation. Star trackers rely on the user ensuring the mount is polar aligned with high accuracy, as it is unable to correct in the secondary declination axis, limiting exposure times.

Dual axis mounts use two motors to drive both the right ascension and the declination axis together. This mount will compensate for the Earth's rotation by driving the right ascension axis, similar to a star tracker. However using an auto-guiding system, the secondary declination axis can also be driven, compensating for errors in polar alignment, allowing for significantly longer exposure times.

"Piggyback" photography

Piggyback astronomical photography is a method where a camera/lens is mounted on an equatorially mounted astronomical telescope. The telescope is used as a guide scope to keep the field of view centered during the exposure. This allows the camera to use a longer exposure and/or a longer focal length lens or even be attached to some form of photographic telescope co-axial with the main telescope.

Telescope focal plane photography

In this type of photography, the telescope itself is used as the "lens" collecting light for the film or CCD of the camera. Although this allows for the magnification and light-gathering power of the telescope to be used, it is one of the most difficult astrophotography methods. This is because of the difficulties in centering and focusing sometimes very dim objects in the narrow field of view, contending with magnified vibration and tracking errors, and the added expense of equipment (such as sufficiently sturdy telescope mounts, camera mounts, camera couplers, off-axis guiders, guide scopes, illuminated cross-hairs, or auto-guiders mounted on primary telescope or the guide-scope.) There are several different ways cameras (with removable lenses) are attached to amateur astronomical telescopes including:

- Prime focus – In this method the image produced by the telescope falls directly on the film or CCD with no intervening optics or telescope eyepiece.
- Positive projection – A method in which the telescope eyepiece (eyepiece projection) or a positive lens (placed after the focal plane of the telescope objective) is used to project a much more magnified image directly onto the film or CCD. Since the image is magnified with a narrow field of view this method is generally used for lunar and planetary photography.
- Negative projection – This method, like positive projection, produces a magnified image. A negative lens, usually a Barlow or a photographic teleconverter, is placed in the light cone before the focal plane of the telescope objective.
- Compression – Compression uses a positive lens (also called a focal reducer), placed in the converging cone of light before the focal plane of the telescope objective, to reduce overall image magnification. It is used on very long focal length telescopes, such as Maksutovs and Schmidt–Cassegrains, to obtain a wider field of view, or to reduce the focal ratio of the setup thereby increasing the speed of the system.

When the camera lens is not removed (or cannot be removed) a common method used is afocal photography, also called afocal projection. In this method, both the camera lens and the telescope eyepiece are in the sensor's line of sight. When both are focused at infinity the light path between them is parallel (afocal), allowing the camera to basically photograph anything the observer can see. This method works well for capturing images of the moon and brighter planets, as well as narrow field images of stars and nebulae. Afocal photography was common with early 20th-century consumer-level cameras since many models had non-removable lenses. It has grown in popularity with the introduction of point and shoot digital cameras since most models also have non-removable lenses.

==== Filters ====
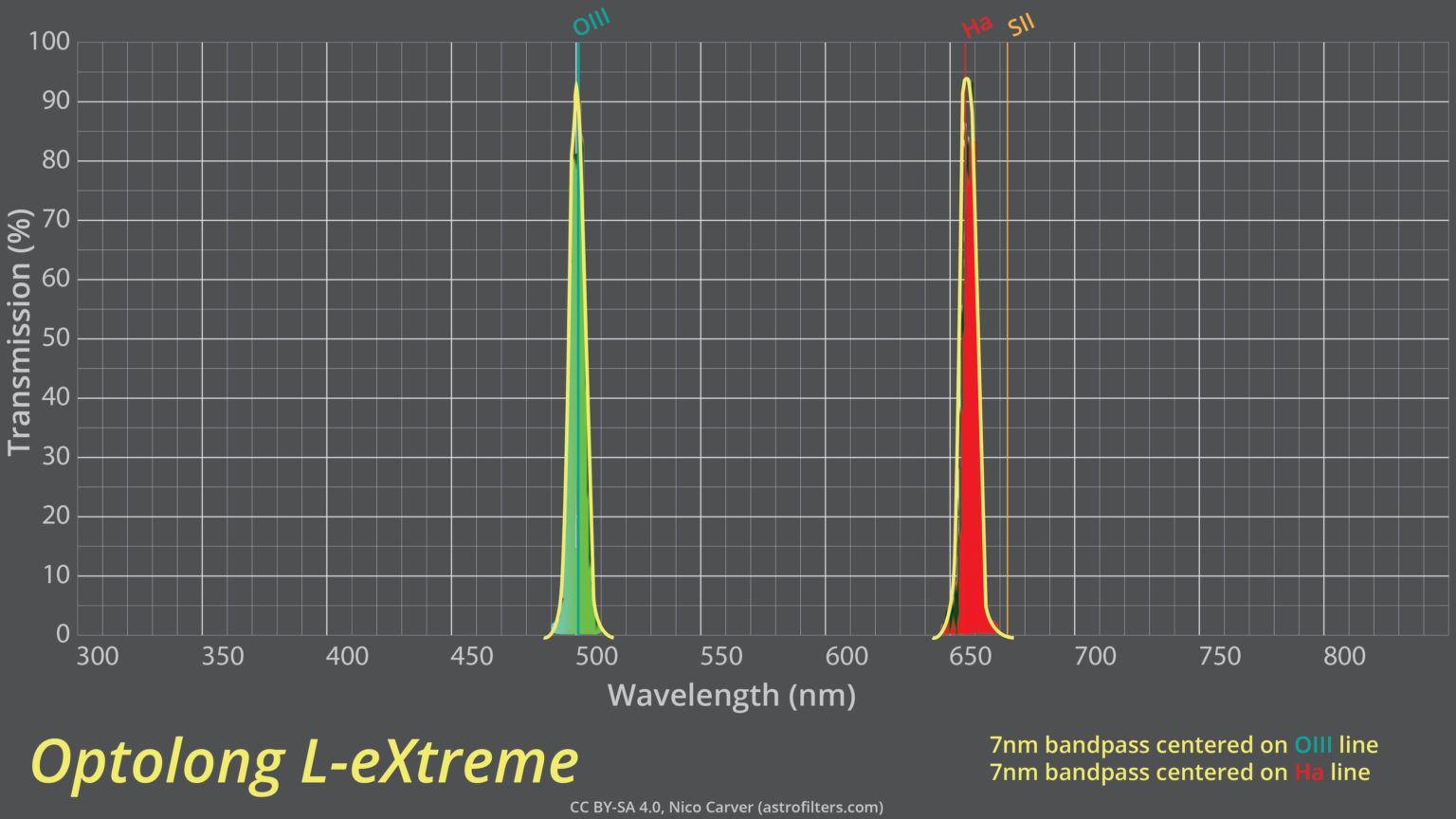
Bandpasses of the popular Optolong l-extreme narrowband filter, allowing only narrow bandpasses around hydrogen-alpha (656nm) and oxygen-III (500nm) to pass through while blocking most light pollution

Filters can be categorised into two classes; broadband and narrowband. Broadband filters allow a wide range of wavelengths to pass through, removing small amounts of light pollution. Narrowband filters only allow light from very specific wavelengths to pass through, blocking out the vast majority of the spectrum.

Astronomical filters usually come as sets and are manufactured to specific standards, in order to allow different observatories to make observations at the same standard. A common filter standard in the astronomy community is Johnson UBV, designed to match a CCD's color response to that of photographic film. However, there are over 200 available standards.

==== Remote telescope ====
With the development of fast internet in the last part of the 20th century along with advances in computer controlled telescope mounts and CCD cameras, "remote telescope" astronomy is now a viable means for amateur astronomers not aligned with major telescope facilities to partake in research and deep sky imaging. This enables anyone to control a telescope a great distance away in a dark location. The observer can image through the telescope using CCD cameras. The digital data collected by the telescope is then transmitted and displayed to the user by means of the Internet. An example of a digital remote telescope operation for public use via the Internet is the Bareket Observatory, and there are telescope farms in New Mexico, Australia and Atacama in Chile.

== Gallery ==
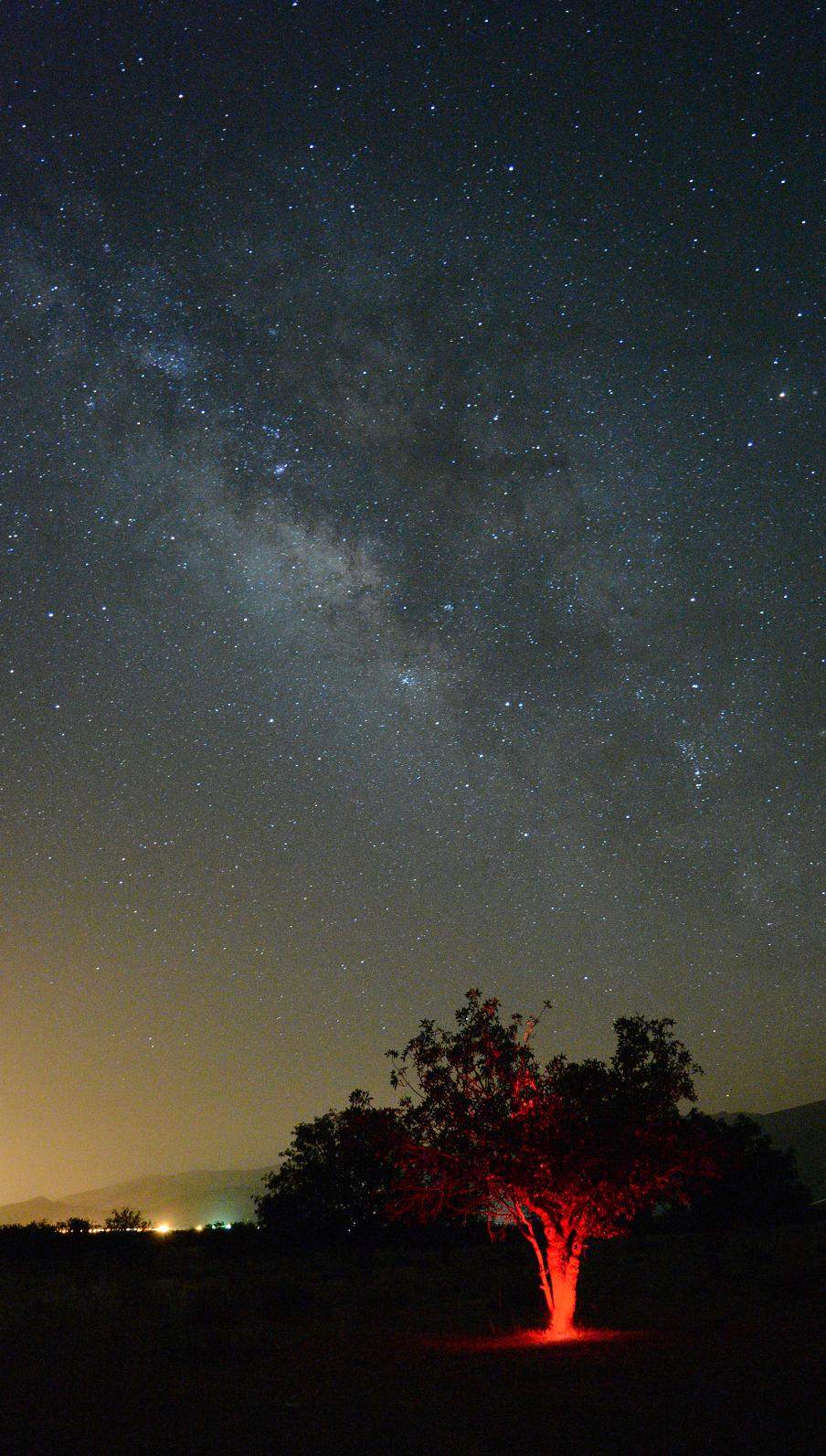
20 second exposure photograph taken with a tripod mounted DSLR camera with 18–55mm lens

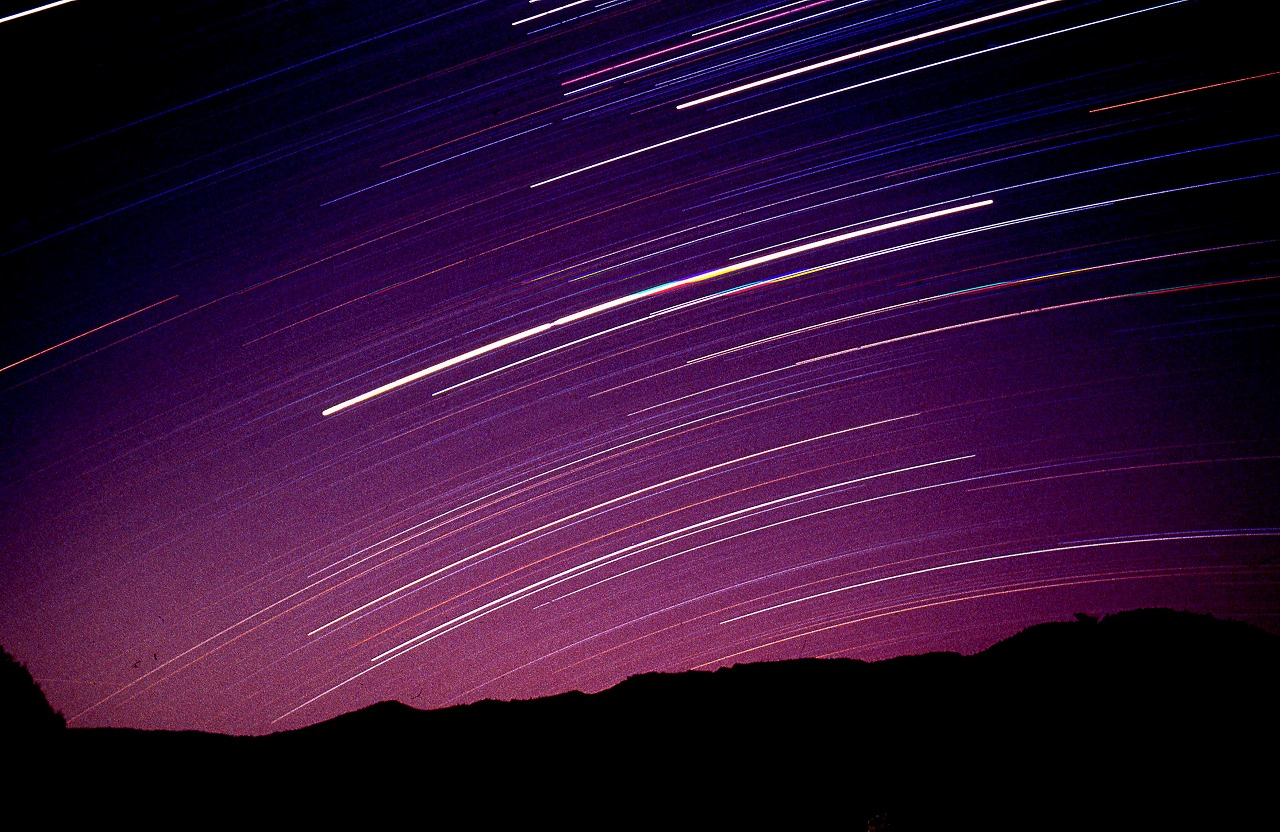
Fixed tripod mounted camera capturing star trails

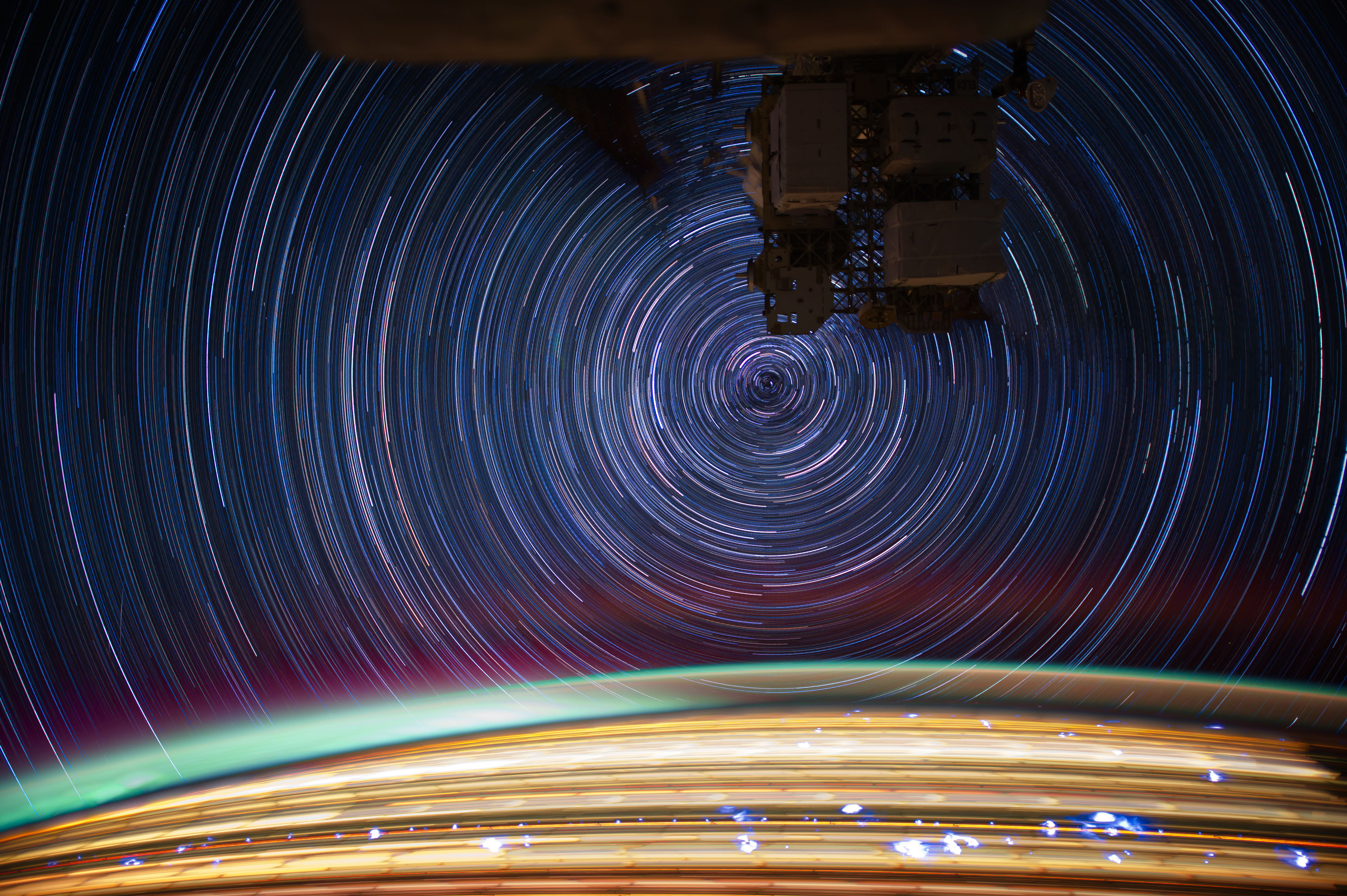
Star trails photographed in earth orbit from the International Space Station

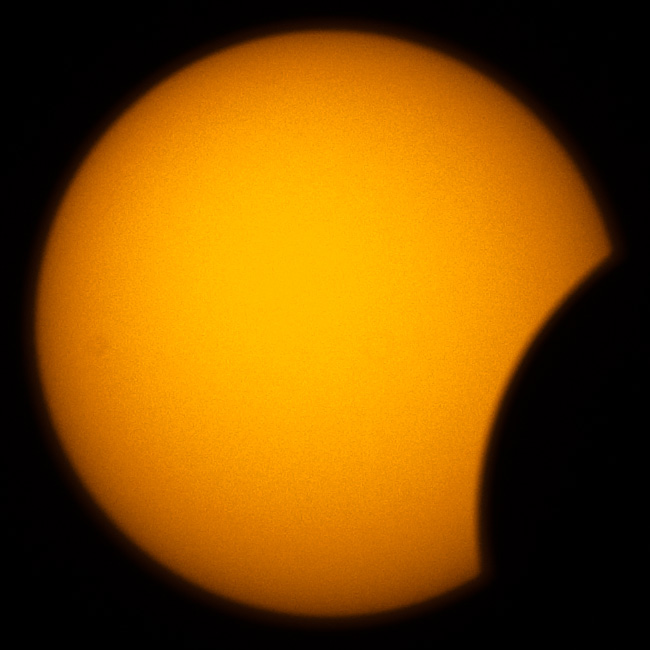
Fixed tripod image of a solar eclipse using a digital-SLR camera with a 500 mm lens

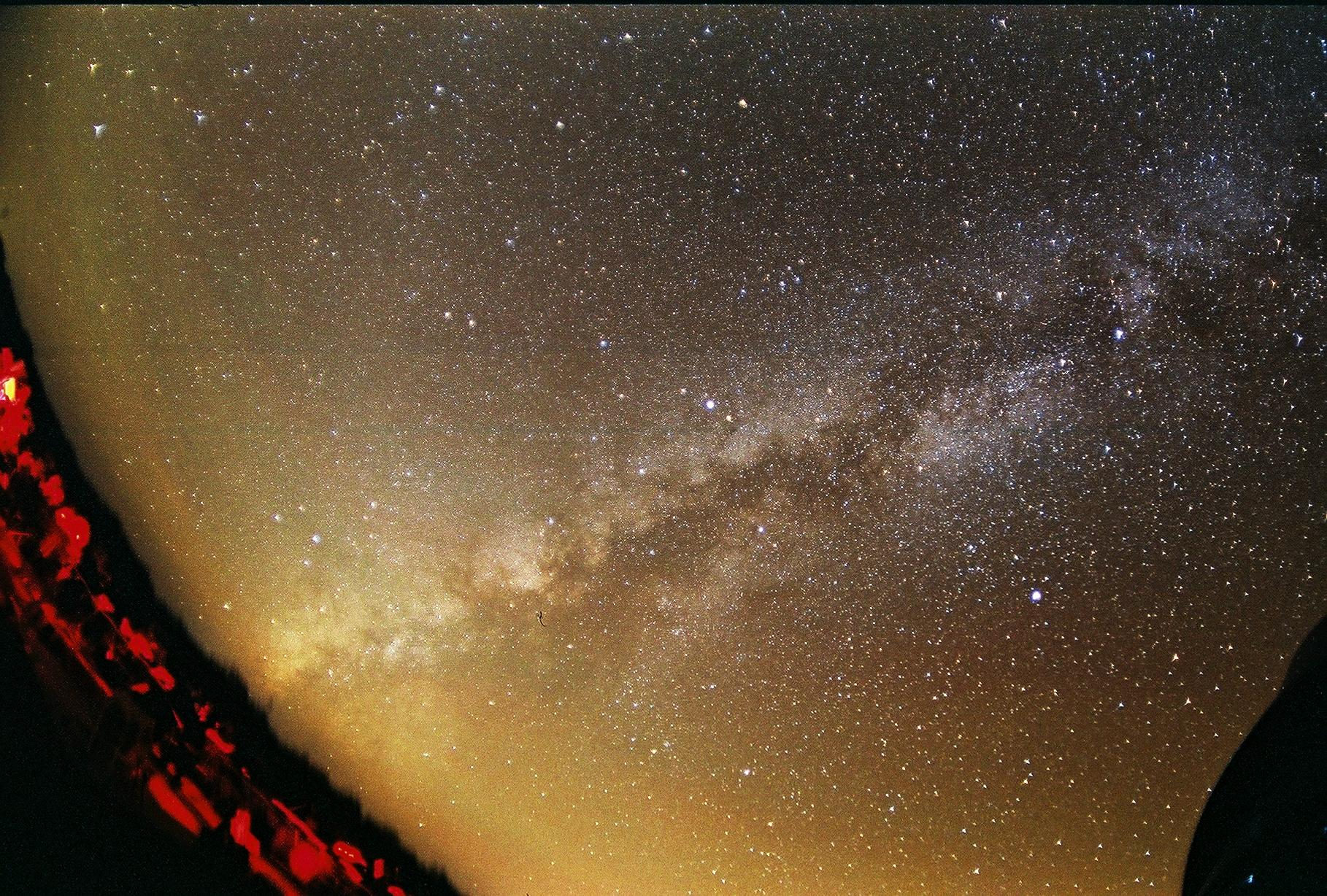
Milky Way, 1 minute exposure using ISO 800 film, wide angle lens, piggybacked on an equatorial telescope

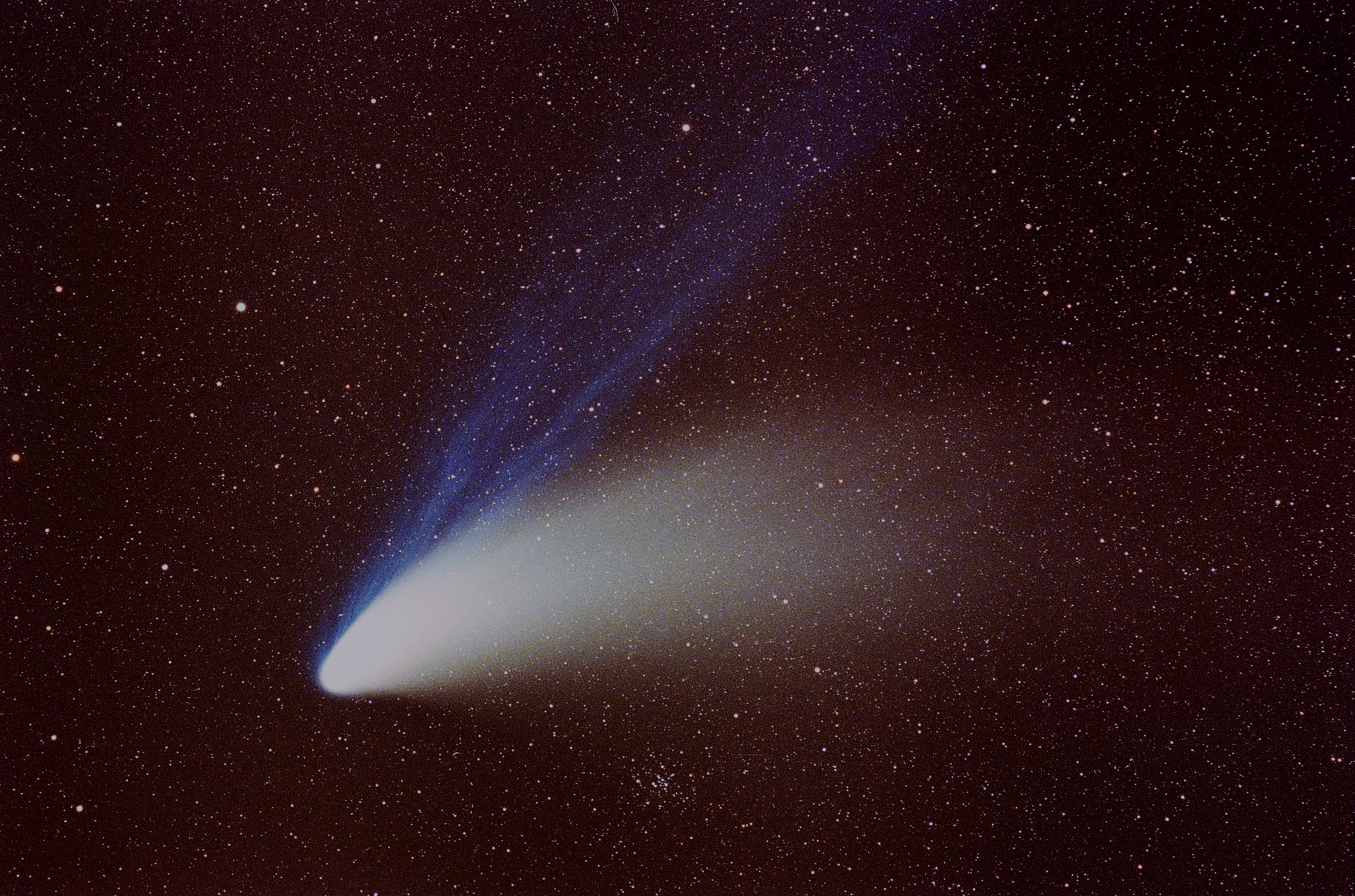
Comet Hale-Bopp, camera with a 300mm lens piggybacked

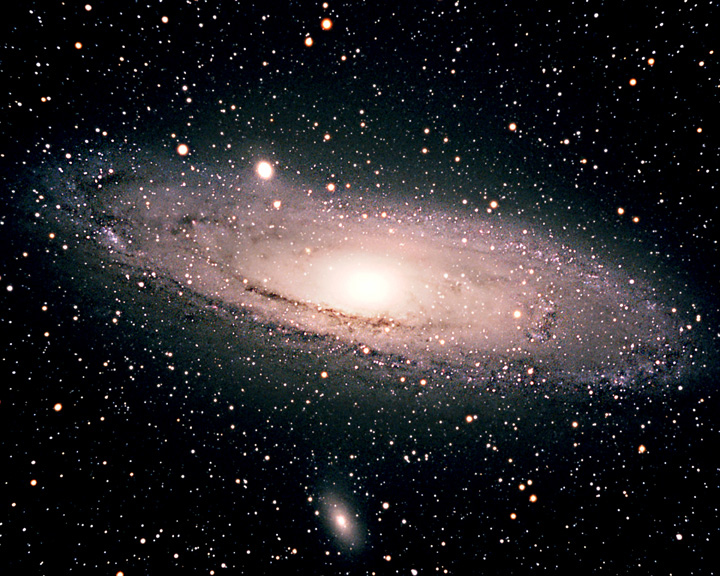
Film image of the Andromeda Galaxy shot at the prime focus of an 8" f/4 Schmidt–Newton telescope

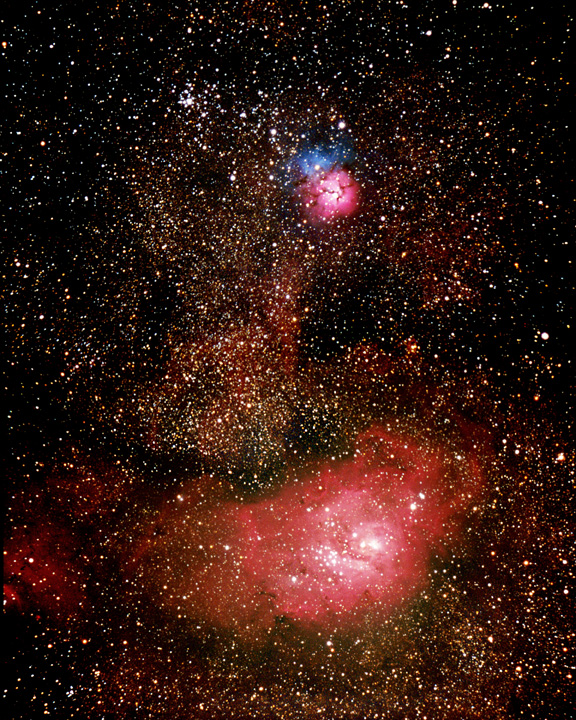
Lagoon and Trifid Nebulae in a montage of two film exposures with an 8" Schmidt–Newton telescope, manually guided

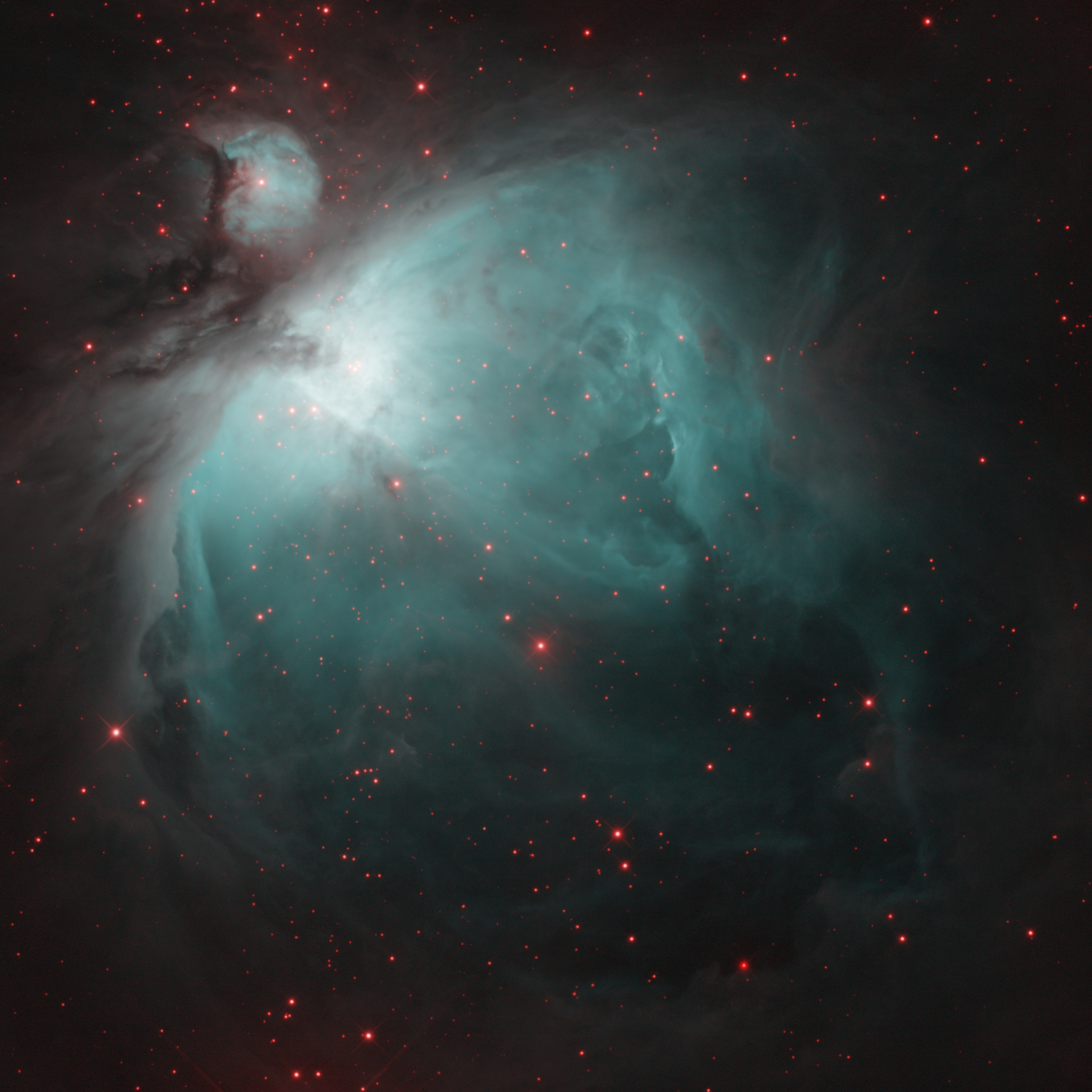
A false color 4-panel mosaic of the Orion Nebula, with near infrared data in the red channel and H-alpha data in the green and blue channels, taken with an 8" f/8 Ritchey–Chrétien telescope and monochrome camera with filters.

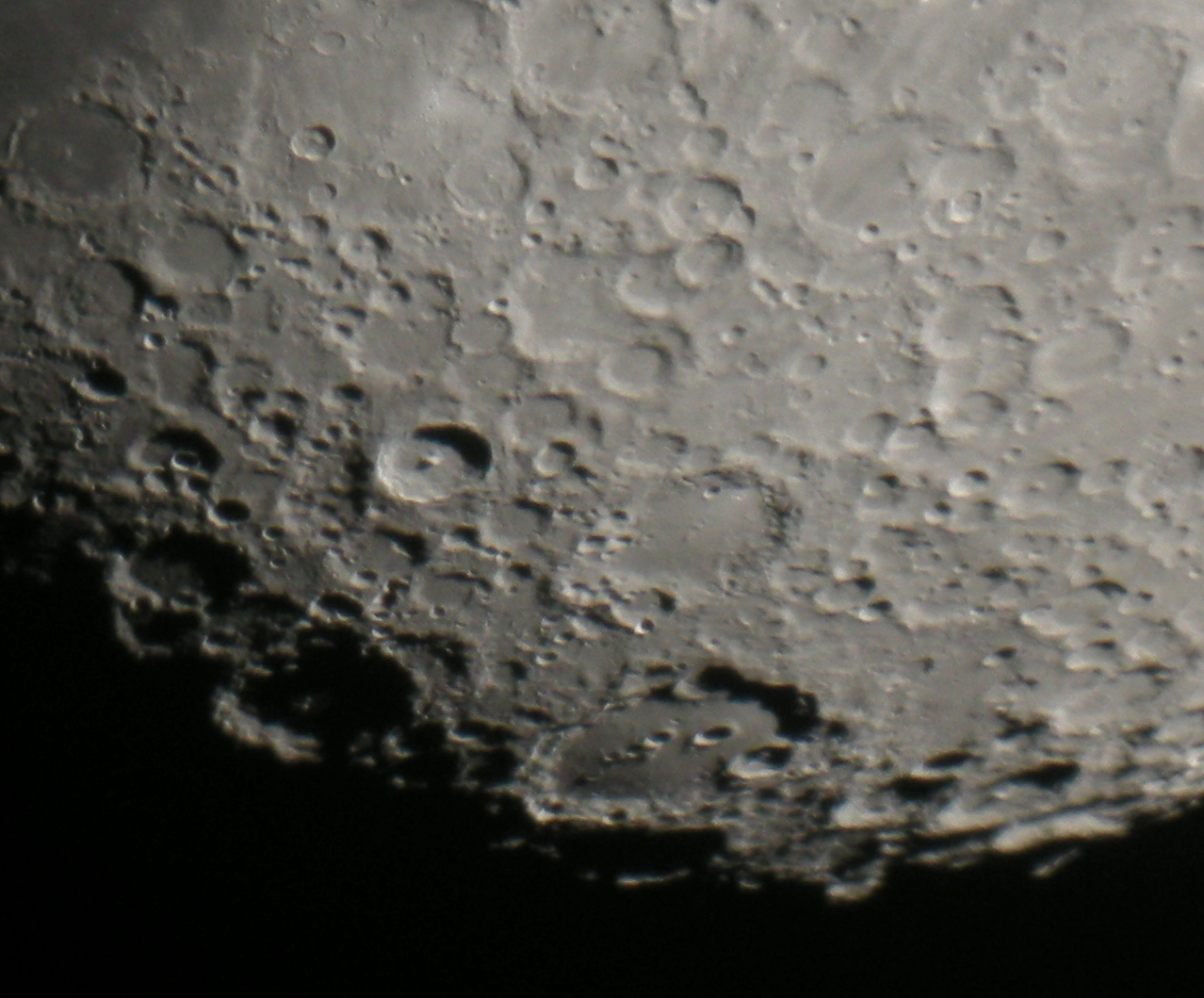
Image of the moon taken with a Nikon Coolpix P5000 digital camera via afocal projection through an 8-inch Schmidt–Cassegrain telescope

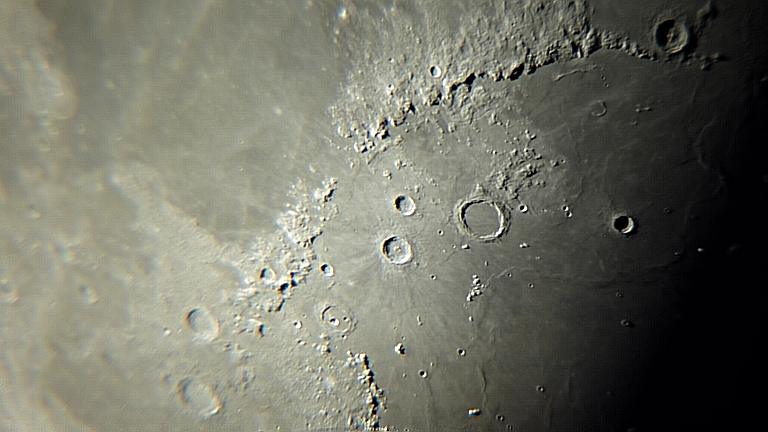
The Moon photographed using the afocal technique, using 10 seconds of video stacked to create a final image.

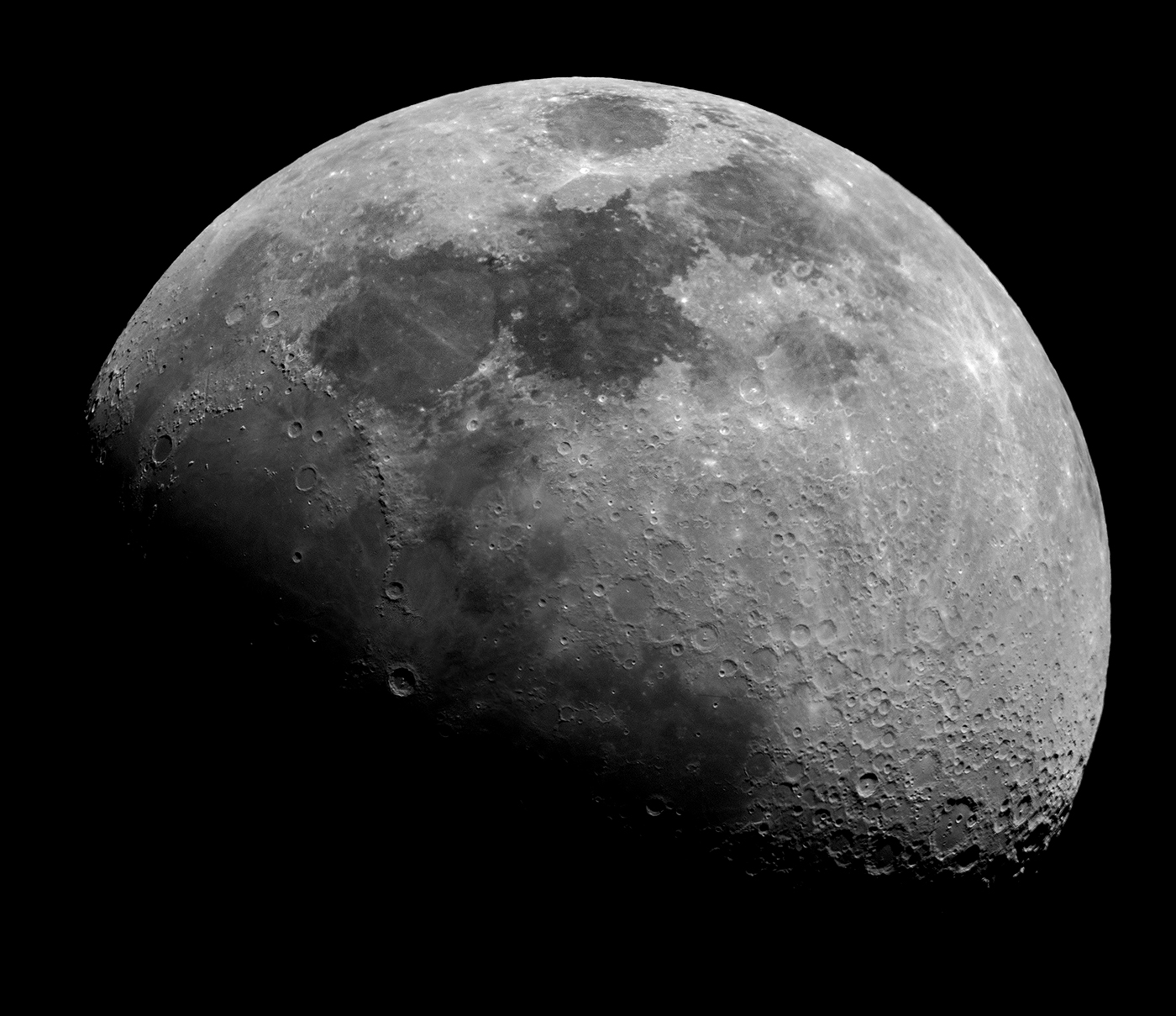
A composite of several Digital-SLR photos compiled in Photoshop taken via eyepiece projection from an 8-inch Schmidt–Cassegrain telescope.

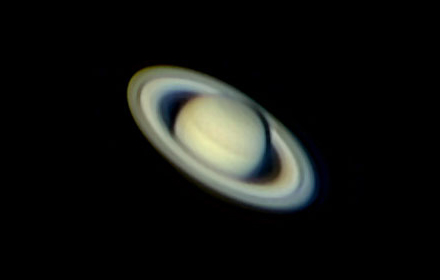
Saturn image using negative projection (Barlow lens) with a webcam attached to a 250mm Newtonian telescope. It is a composite image made from 10% of the best exposures out of 1200 images.

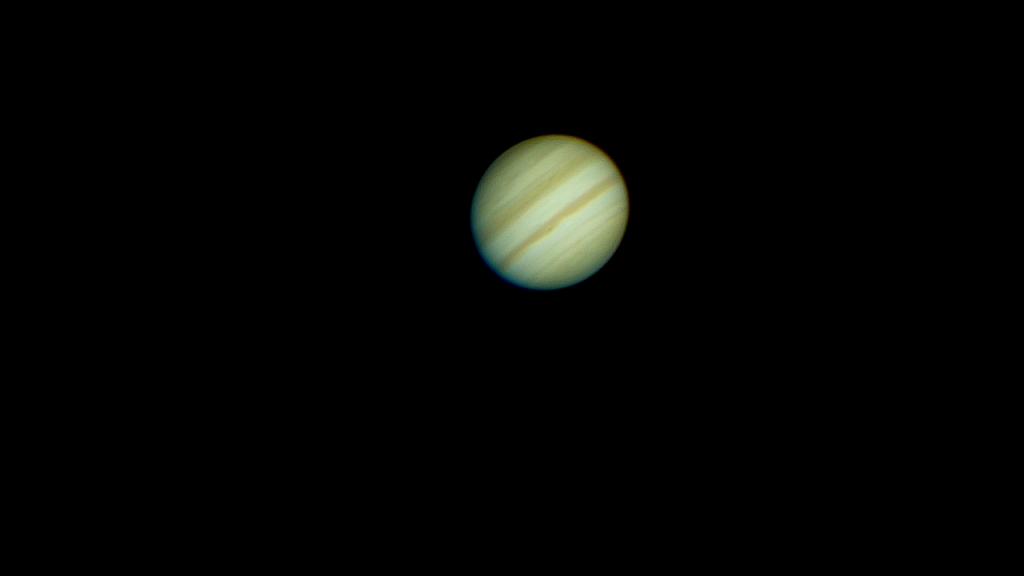
Jupiter photographed using the afocal technique, using 10 seconds of video stacked to create a final image.

== See also ==
- Cameras
  - Canon EOS 20Da
  - Canon EOS 60Da
  - Nikon D810A
- Charge-coupled device
- Cold camera photography
- Light pollution
  - Bortle scale
- List of Hubble anniversary images
- LRGB (Luminance, Red, Green, and Blue)
- Montage (image software)
- National Geographic Society – Palomar Observatory Sky Survey
- Night photography
  - Star trail
- Satellite photography

Astrophotographers

- Edward Emerson Barnard
- Ken Crawford
- Robert Gendler
- Jack Newton
- Isaac Roberts
- Max Wolf
