= Guide star =

Reference star used by telescopes for tracking purposes

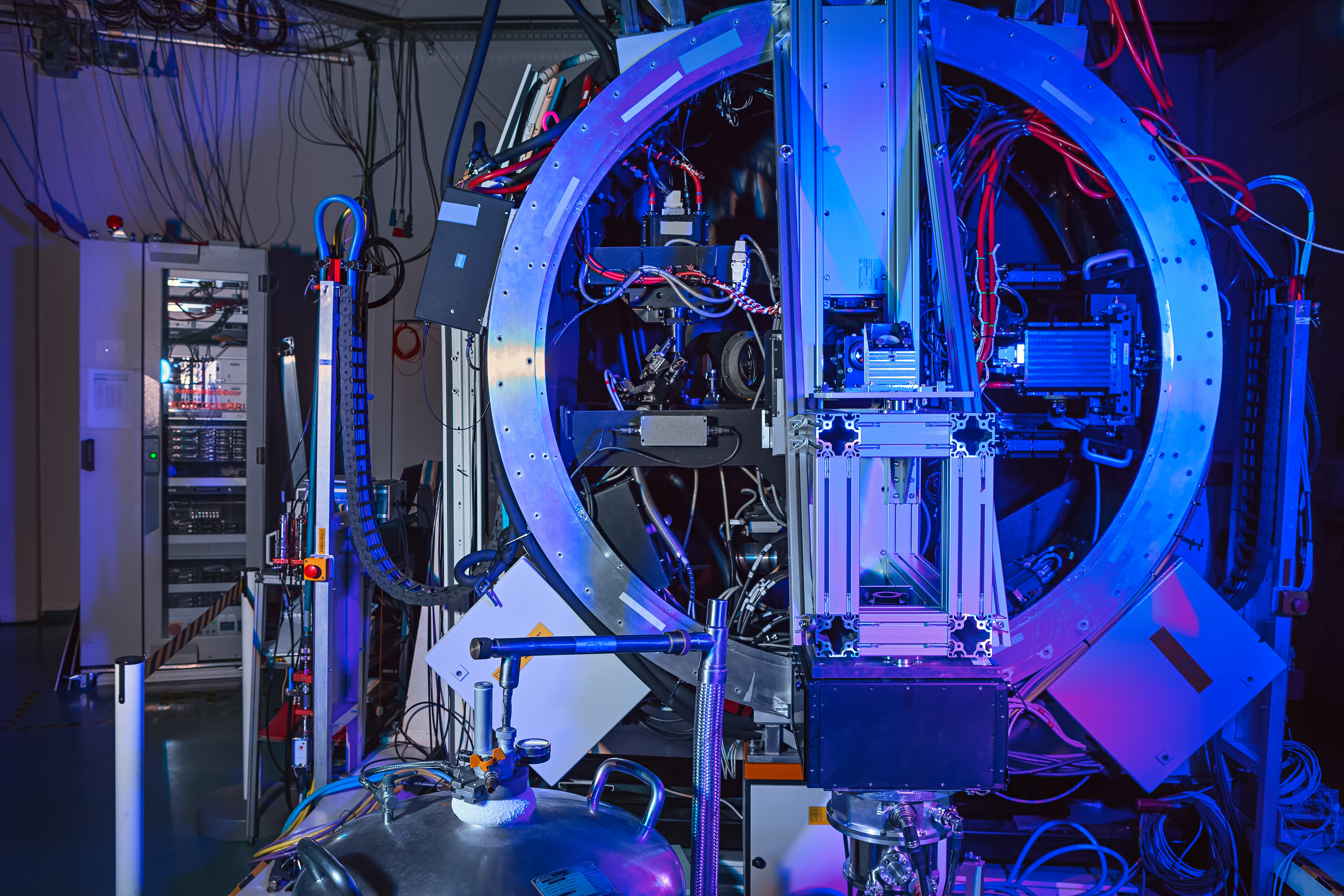
GALACSI adaptive optics system for the Very Large Telescope uses artificial laser guide stars

In astronomy, a guide star is a reference star used to accurately maintain the tracking by a telescope of a celestial body, whose apparent motion through the sky is primarily due to Earth's rotation.

Accurate telescope pointing and tracking is critical for obtaining good astronomical images and astrophotographs. However, because Earth rotates, the sky appears to be in a constant state of motion relative to Earth. Although this movement appears to be relatively slow when viewed with the naked eye, with the high magnification and consequently smaller field of view provided by even a small telescope, this motion becomes apparent on timescales of the order of seconds.

Though space telescopes are not mounted on a spinning planet, they still use guide stars including those listed in the HST Guide Star Catalog.

Computer-controlled electric motors are commonly employed to allow the telescope to move in sync with the apparent motion of the sky, according to a pre-computed pointing model. However, there is usually a significant non-zero error associated with the model, which is an approximation to the true motion of the sky.

Most modern professional telescopes use a guide star. An autoguider is pointed to a sufficiently luminous star that lies near the object being observed and, if the pointing begins to drift, the error can be detected and the movement corrected. This is most accurate when the corrections are applied by a computer, but amateur telescopes often have manual correction (requiring the observer to continuously follow the star by eye for the exposure period, which may be a significant length of time).

Guide stars are also employed in adaptive optics. In this application, the star is not used to correct for the rotation of the Earth, but to correct for turbulence in the Earth's atmosphere. By measuring the observed motion of the guide star, and making minute distortions to the primary mirror, the telescope can produce images with much greater sharpness than is possible without adaptive optics. However, only about 1 percent of the night sky is close enough to a natural guide star to use adaptive optics, so various methods to create artificial laser guide stars have been developed, including the sodium laser system developed by the Lawrence Livermore National Laboratory and used by the University of California's Lick and Keck observatories.

== See also ==
- Celestial sphere
- Fixed stars
- Pole star
