= Robert Gendler =

American physician

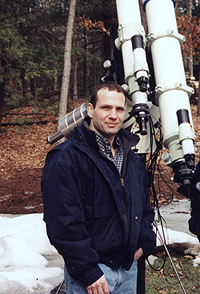
Robert Gendler

Robert Gendler (born September 30, 1957) is an American physician, amateur astronomer, author and astrophotographer.

He has used CCD cameras since starting out in astrophotography and specializes in images of deep sky objects with very long exposure times. His photographs are regularly published in astronomy magazines, including Sky & Telescope and on the Astronomy Picture of the Day website. In September 2005, Astronomy Magazine cited a mosaic of the Andromeda Galaxy (M31) as one of "the most beautiful astronomical images of the past thirty years."

The image also appears in the Guinness Book of Records in 2008, under the largest image (in number of pixels) of a spiral galaxy ever. In 2007, one of his photographs of IC 405, the Flaming Star Nebula, was included in one of six Royal Mail commemorative stamps, commemorating the 50th anniversary of The Sky at Night. In 2011 his image of the Pleiades appeared in a German Postal series "For the Youth". In 2007 he was awarded the "Hubble Prize" at the annual Advanced Imaging Conference in San Jose California. Also in 2007 he was featured in Timothy Ferris's PBS documentary "Seeing in the Dark". The Santa Barbara Instrument Group (SBIG) awarded him its Award of Excellence for astronomical imaging.. In 2013 and 2015 Gendler collaborated with the Hubble Heritage Team processing two Hubble Space Telescope releases (M106 in 2013 and M31 in 2015). M31 which Gendler assembled and processed (The PHAT Hubble survey consists of 7,398 exposures taken over 411 individual pointings and assembled by Gendler into a mosaic image) remains the largest Hubble image ever made. In 2019, Gendler received the Royal Photographic Society Award for Scientific Imaging, with Honorary Fellowship.

Gendler has published five books A Year in the Life of the Universe: A Seasonal Guide to Viewing the Cosmos (Voyageur Press 2006), Capturing the Stars: Astrophotography by the Masters (Voyageur Press 2009),"Treasures of the Southern Sky" (Springer 2011), "Lessons from the Masters: Current Concepts in Astronomical Image Processing" (Springer 2013), Breakthrough! 100 Astronomical Images which Changed the World" (Springer, 2015). Gendler's most recent book "Breakthrough!" was selected as "Outstanding Academic Title" by "Choice" magazine, a periodical of the American Library Association (2016).

Gendler is a physician and lives in Connecticut.

Gendler took the photograph of the Andromeda galaxy that was used by Apple as the default wallpaper in Mac OS X 10.7 Lion, Though it has been heavily edited from the original.
