= Cold camera photography =

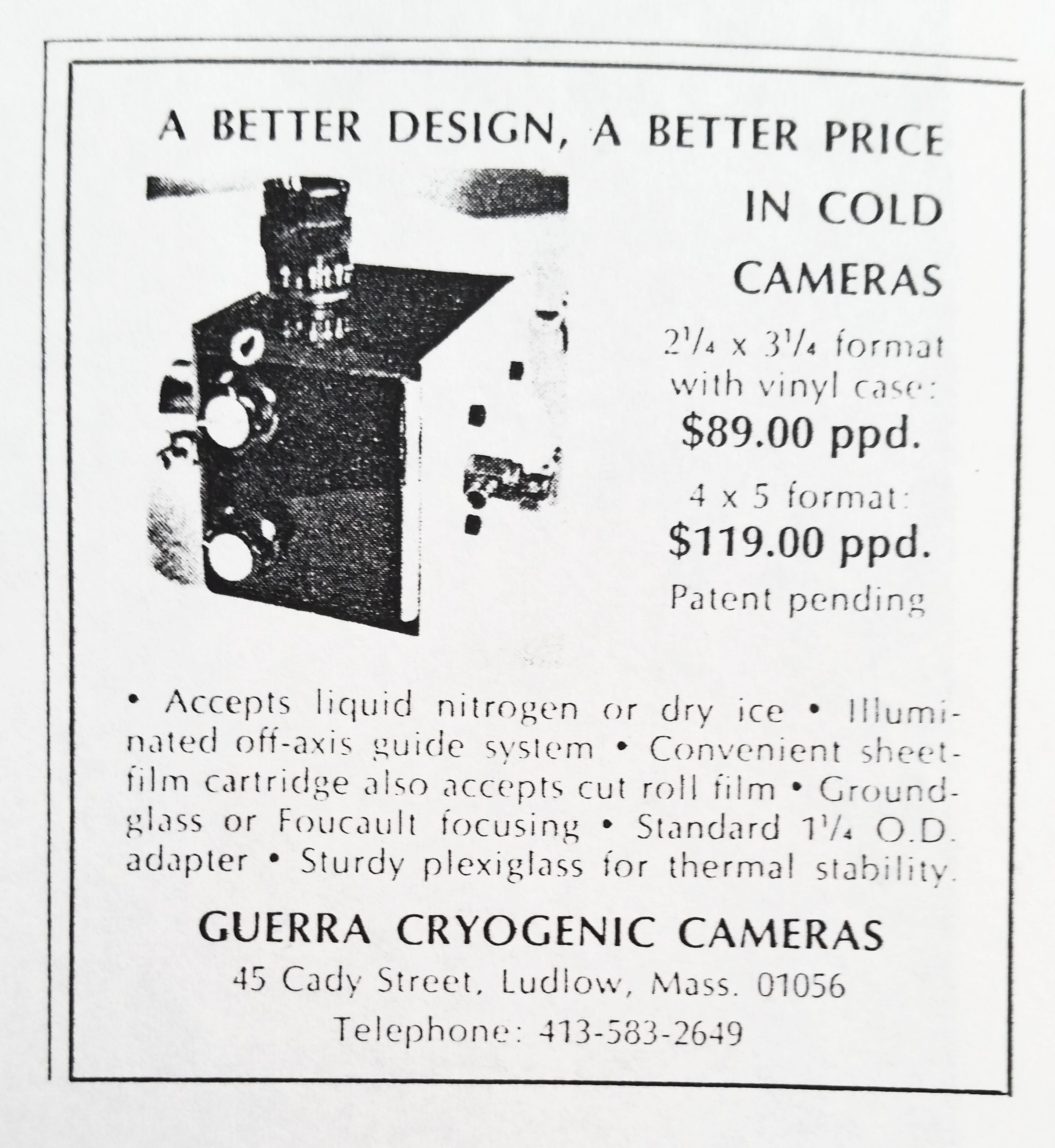
Guerra Cryogenic Camera ad in May, 1974 Sky & Telescope.

Cold camera photography is a technique used by astrophotographers to reduce the electronic noise that accumulates during long exposures with the electronic sensors in DSLRs and dedicated CMOS or CCD astro-cameras. Cooling is usually accomplished with a Peltier thermo-electric cooler. By cooling the camera's sensor, one can take longer shots without the worry of the chip heating up, thereby reducing thermal, shot and read noise.

For astrophotography in the near infra-red, such as with the James Webb Space Telescope, cameras are cooled to cryogenic temperatures in order to eliminate thermal noise sources. Cryogenic cameras for infra-red imaging are used on Earth for many purposes. (Cameras that are designed to operate in cryogenic environments are also referred to as cryogenic cameras.)

For traditional film cameras, cooling is required to reduce the Reciprocity Effect (or Reciprocity Failure), in which the effective film "ASA" sensitivity decreases with time in long exposures. That reciprocity is different for each color in the emulsion, and so it also leads to color-shift in the final image. Cooling of chemical emulsion film is usually achieved by using a cold camera that is dedicated to cooled astrophotography. Cooling in this case is usually achieved by contacting dry ice to a platen that is in turn contacted to the film. This technique was popularized by renowned astrophotographer Jack B. Newton, and even earlier, Evered Kreimer used his own design to obtain the images in the Messier Album that he co-authored with John Malias.

== Commercial Cold Cameras ==
Many amateur and professional astronomers have had to design and make their own cold cameras for cooled traditional film astrophotography. as none were commercially available until the early to mid-1970s. One of the impediments is that the cooled film emulsion quickly becomes coated with a layer of ice.

=== Williams / Celestron Cold Camera ===
Bill Williams solved this in the early 1970s by contacting the emulsion to a thick (about 2 inches thick, or 5 cm) plug of plastic, usually acrylic. The natural thermal insulating property of the plastic meant that the front surface, exposed to the humidity in the air, would not become cold enough to ice-over during the course of the long exposure. Williams showed this camera at the Stellafane Convention in Springfield, VT, Celestron International soon licensed his patent and produced it commercially for several years.

While the Williams cold camera solved the problem of condensation on the cooled emulsion, it required difficult handling of a cut piece of film, usually from a 35mm roll, in the dark and in the field, to position it between the plastic plug and the cooling plate. Also, the thick plug itself introduced optical aberrations, especially with the fast optical systems used in astrophotography. And any scratches in the surface, especially the one in contact with the emulsion, directly contributed to the image (although replacement plugs could be purchased).

=== Guerra Instruments Cryogenic Camera ===
The first ad for the Guerra Instruments Cryogenic Camera appeared in Sky & Telescope in 1974. Guerra Instruments was a small business in Ludlow, Massachusetts, started by John Guerra in his parents' basement (who also helped with correspondence and provided patent drawings), with co-amateur astronomer Charles "Chuck" Miller. Guerra Instruments operated from 1974 to about 1978, as Guerra joined Polaroid's Optical Engineering Dept. (Cambridge, Mass.) in late 1976.

Guerra's main innovation was to eliminate the need for the thick plastic plug by placing the film in a sealed chamber that contained a desiccant. The use of a desiccant to prevent icing in modern cooled CMOS and CCD cameras is now ubiquitous, but in 1974 it was a patented innovation.

From Guerra's patent: "A Cryogenic Camera in which an aluminum refrigeration chamber filled with dry ice or liquid nitrogen makes contact with the back of a metallic film-holder upon closing the hinged back of the camera, to which the refrigeration chamber is bolted. The film-holder is positioned within the camera body so as to form a small volume in front of the film. This volume contains a silica gel desiccant packet that absorbs moisture in this volume, which is sealed upon closing the aforementioned hinged back. Thus frosting of the film and of the Plexiglas window that seals the camera aperture is prevented. The presence of this volume allows integration of an off-axis guide system within the camera, the guide system consisting of a flip-up mirror, rheostat controlled illuminated crosshairs, and a focusing eyepiece. The crosshairs illumination is provided by a red light emitting diode powered by two penlight cells contained within the volume."

Additional dry desiccant packets, hand-sewn by Grace Guerra and Cristina Guerra, were easily carried into the field and "swapped out" of the chamber for the next exposure. The use of standard sheet film holders, with their integral dark slides, meant that multiple holders could be loaded with film in the dark at home and carried into the field, for easy loading of a new emulsion. Special adapters were provided to facilitate loading of 35 mm cut film into these holders.

Most were operated with dry ice. But the camera could also use liquid nitrogen supplied in the field with a Dewar flask. With that refrigerant, the dry nitrogen bleed-off was vented into the film chamber for enhanced protection from humidity.

While most of the cameras were 2.25" x 3.25" format with a 1.25" O.D. nosepiece, some were made with 2.0" nosepieces and even larger. A few large format 4"x 5" cameras were also produced.

In addition to the integral off-axis flip mirror guiding system, the red-LED variable-illumination reticle, and the focusing eyepiece, the Guerra Cryogenic Camera included a focusing film holder that included both a ground-glass screen and a Foucault knife-edge focuser. And the cameras were each shipped with a custom zippered case, designed and hand-sewn by Suzanne Gaudette (later Guerra), in black and white Naugahyde with a plush red felt lining.

All told, over 60 cameras were produced by hand and sold to customers around the world: England, W. Germany, Japan, Mexico, Canada, and throughout the United States. The first was purchased by Alfred State College in New York. Sonoma College in CA still lists a Guerra Cryogenic Camera in their equipment inventory.

=== Newton Cold Cameras ===
Beginning around 1992, Jack Newton produced hand-made cold cameras that, like the Williams Cold Camera, used a thick optical plug. However, in a major improvement, his camera could use 35mm roll film canisters, rather than having to cut pieces. Production began some time after the Williams cameras were no longer available from Celestron International.

The following descriptive is an excerpt from a Sky & Telescope Test Report authored by Johnny Horne, himself an amateur astrophotographer of Jack Newton's standing: ."The plastic camera body has a metal "cold" plate that contacts the back of the film. After a pair of standard 35-mm film cassettes are placed in the camera, the film is advanced with a knob that turns only in the correct direction. Since a roll can be easily changed even though it isn't completely used, you can preload cassettes with various emulsions for use during the night. Mounted on the back of the film holder is the dry-ice chamber with its screw-on cap and spring-loaded plunger for pressing the dry ice against the cold plate. The chamber holds about three tablespoonfuls of granular dry ice, which lasted about 40 minutes on a night when the air temperature was about 60 degrees Fahrenheit. The film remains quite cold for several minutes after the ice has completely sublimated."

== Cooled Digital Imaging: the end for cold emulsion cameras ==
Conventional chemical emulsion film for astrophotography, whether cooled or not, has for the most part come to an end. The discovery of gas-hyper-sensitization of the emulsion in the 1990s largely made cooling the film obsolete. "Hypering" the film was much easier to do, and the film could then be used in conventional cameras, and with results equal to or better than those obtained with cold cameras.

The final blow was brought by the advent of large-format CCD and CMOS digital imagers. Even uncooled, these devices obtain images equal to the best obtained with cold cameras and emulsion film. With cooling to control read-out and other sources of electronic noise, the image results are professional observatory quality, even with modest back-yard amateur telescopes.

The cooling is done electronically with Peltier devices, and some of the dewing/icing is controlled with dew-zapping heaters, but many devices still rely on internal silica-gel desiccant packets to remove moisture, akin to Guerra Cryogenic Cameras.

== See also ==
- Astrophotography
- Charge-coupled device
- CMOS sensor
- Cryogenic cooling
- Thermoelectric cooling
- Reciprocity failure
- Film speed
