= Ken Crawford (astrophotographer) =

American astrophotographer

- Born: Gary, Indiana
- Occupation: Astrophotographer
- Known for: Astrophotography
- Website: www.imagingdeepsky.com

Ken Crawford is an American astrophotographer from Rancho Del Sol Camino, California.

== Early life and education ==
Ken Crawford was born in Gary, Indiana, and was interested in astronomy from a young age. In eighth grade, he built his first telescope. In 1978, he moved to Placerville, California. In 1985, he began his own carpet business, and in 1996 joined with Carpet One to have the largest floor and window covering store in the county.

== Current life ==
In 2001, Crawford renewed his interest in astronomy to become an amateur astrophotographer. In 2004, he was one of the principal founders of the Advanced Imaging Conference held every year in San Jose and has served as president since 2007. In 2008, he was invited to participate in the NASA "Astronomy Picture of the Day" with many of his images appearing as the picture of the day. His images are noted in the astronomy community "for revealing extremely faint structures and details in objects not previously seen."
