= LRGB =

Photographic technique used in astronomy

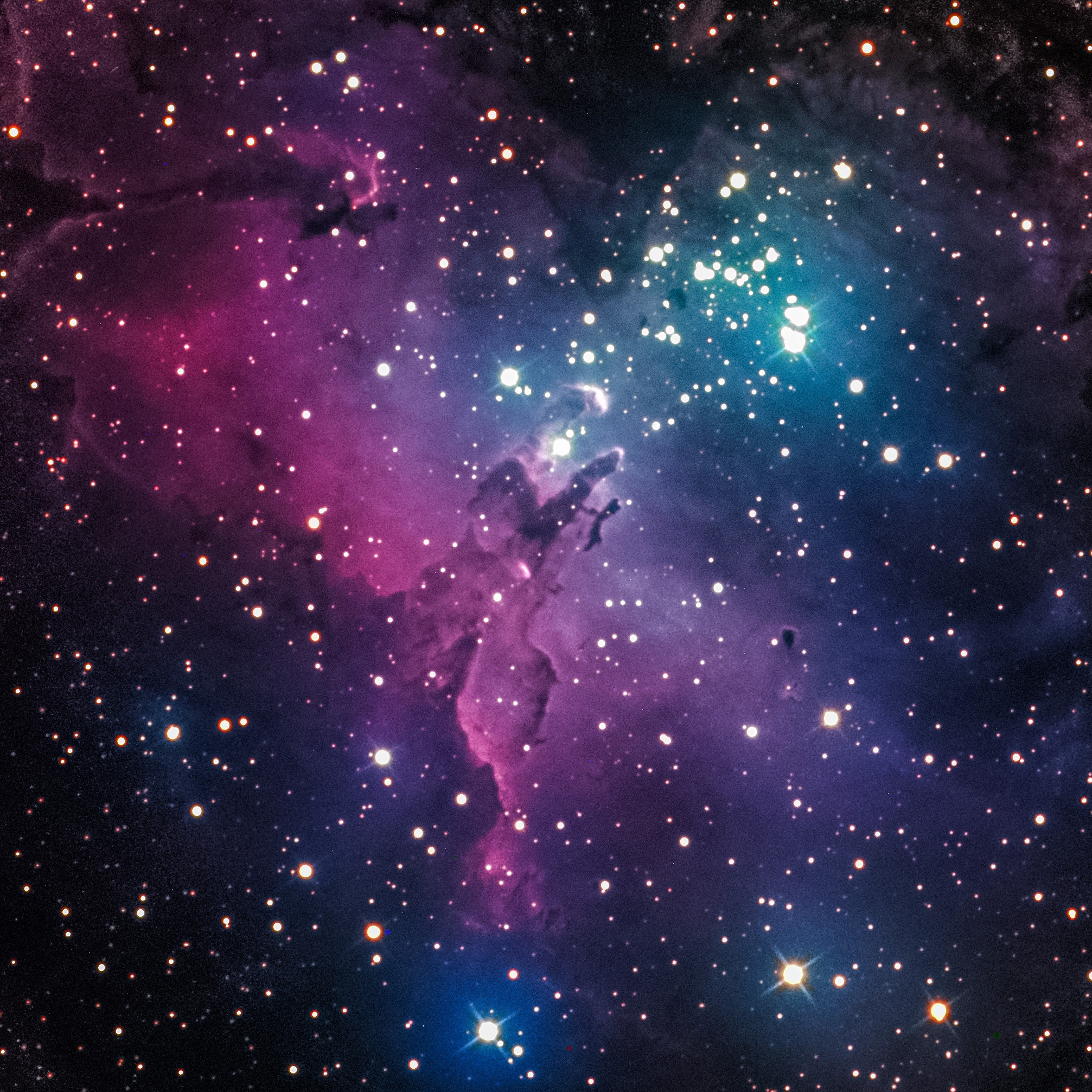
LRGB Photo of the Eagle Nebula.

LRGB, short for Luminance, Red, Green and Blue, is a photographic technique used in amateur astronomy for producing good quality color photographs by combining a high-quality black-and-white image with a lower-quality color image.

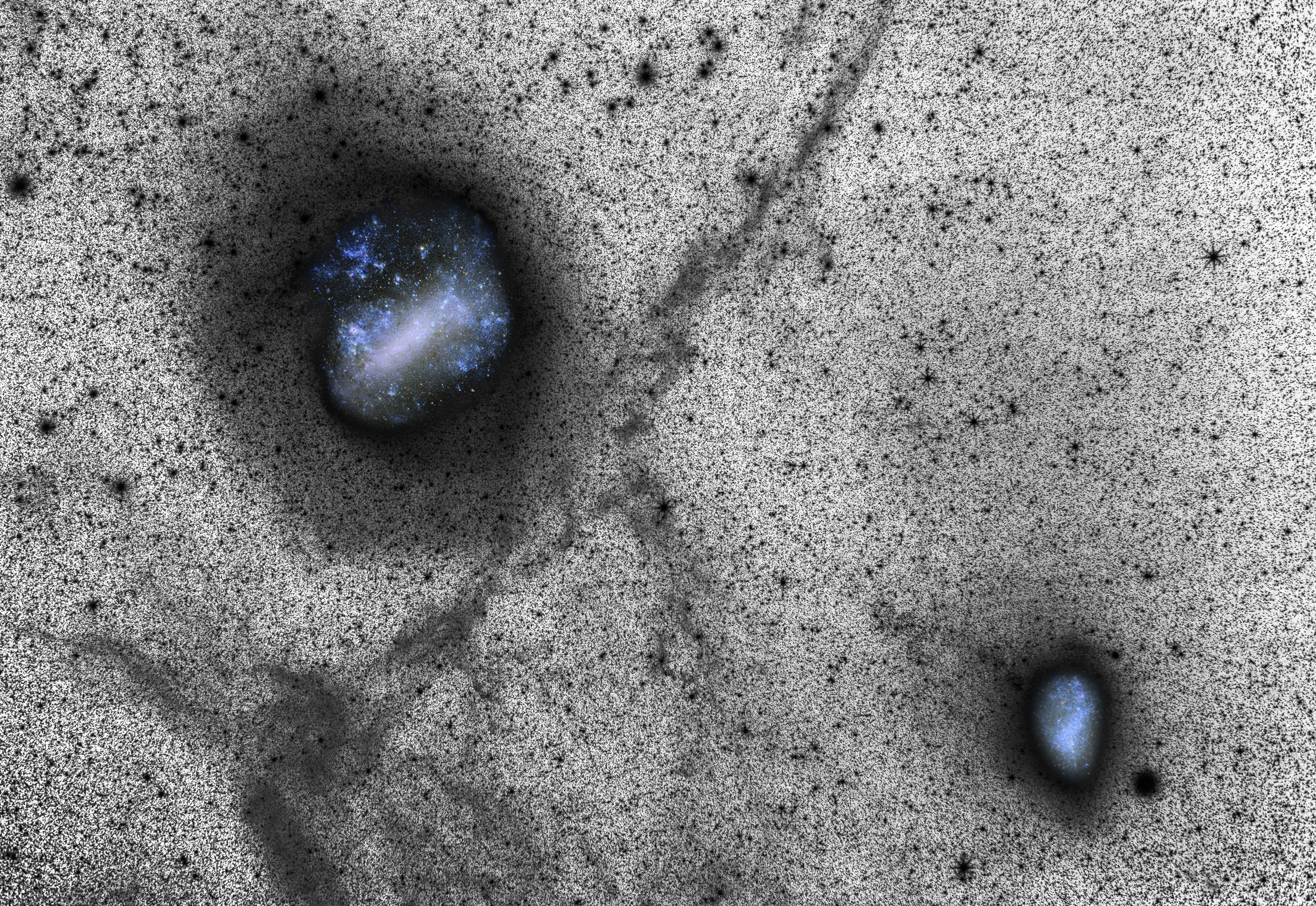
Deep View of the Large and Small Magellanic Clouds captured using the LRGB method.

In astrophotography, it is easier and cheaper to obtain good quality, high signal-to-noise ratio images in black and white. The LRGB method is used to work around this to get good color images. The color (chrominance) information from the color image is combined with the overall brightness from the black-and-white image.

The theory behind the effectiveness of LRGB techniques has been related to the working of human color vision. The rod cells in human eyes are sensitive to luminance and spatial data, while the cone cells are sensitive to color. There are three types of cones: those sensitive to red, those sensitive to green, and those sensitive to blue. Thus, each element of LRGB targets one type of photoreceptor cell in the human eye.

== See also ==
- Astrophotography
