= Finderscope =

Sighting device used in astronomy and stargazing

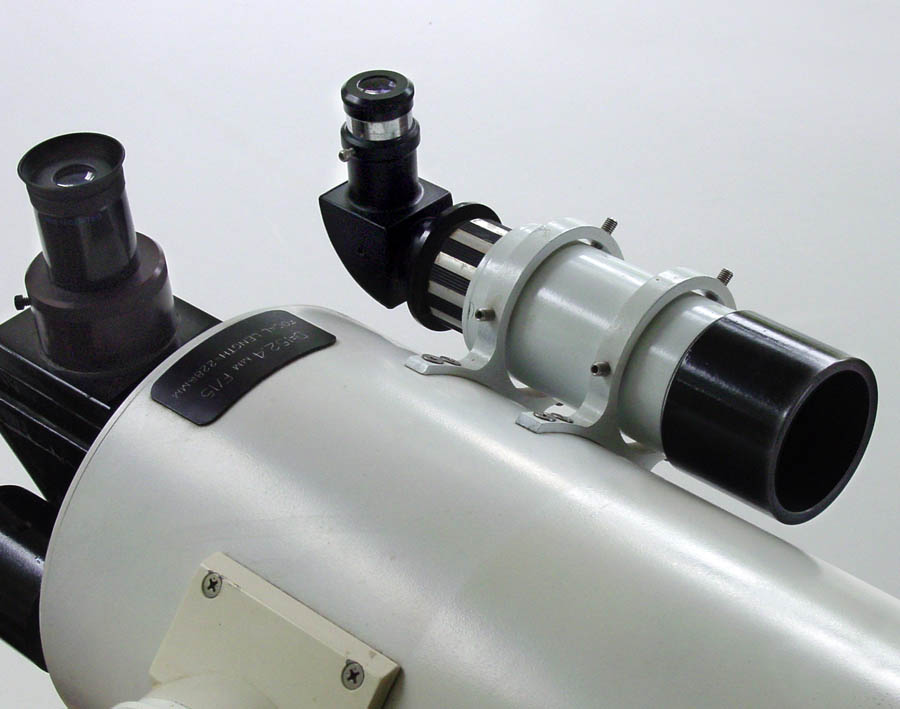
A 50 mm right-angle finderscope mounted on a 150 mm telescope

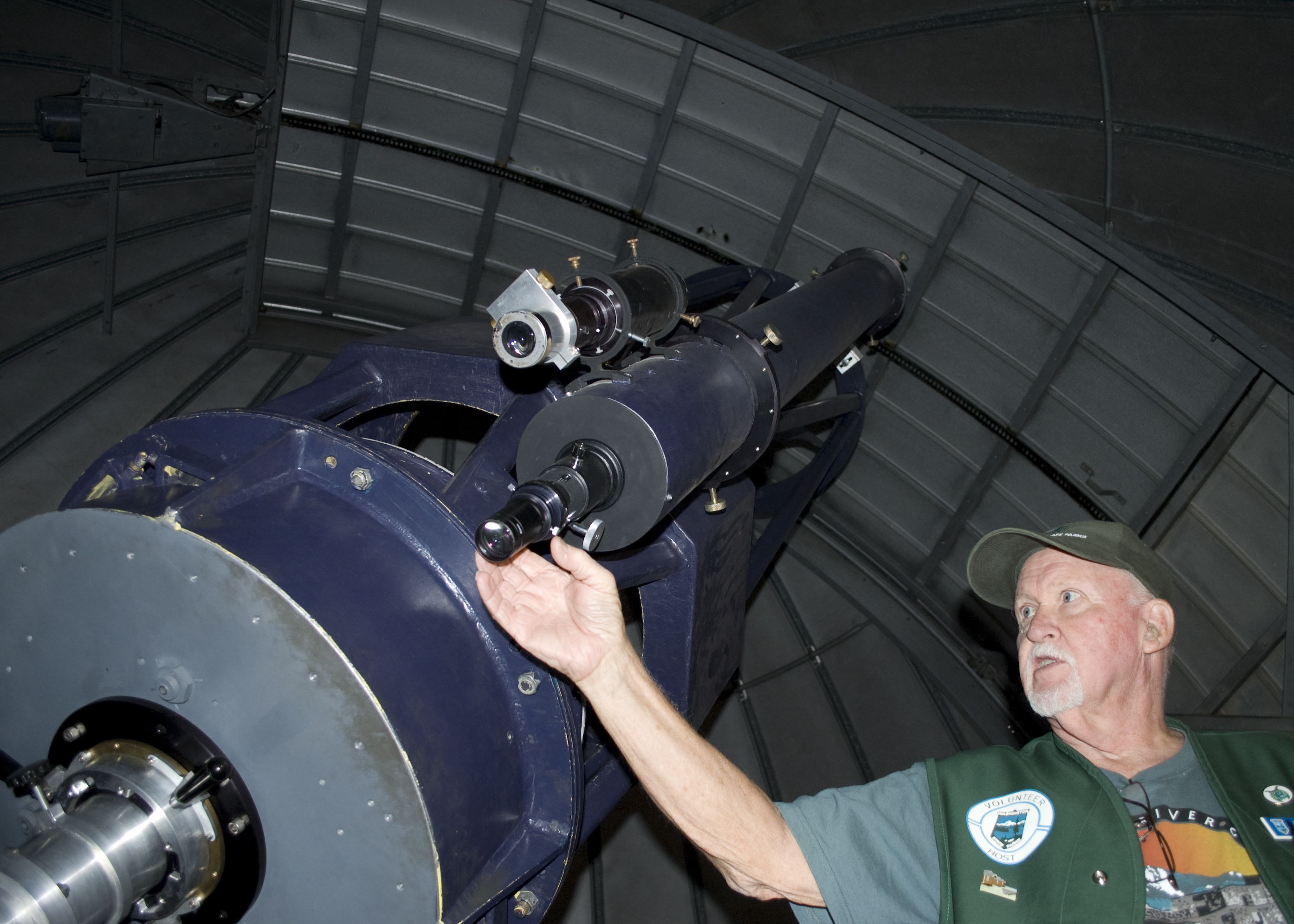
Tour guide points out the double Finderscope on the 24.5 inch Cassegrain Telescope at the Goldendale Observatory State Park.

A finderscope is an accessory sighting device used in astronomy and stargazing, typically a small auxiliary refracting telescope/monocular mounted parallelly on a larger astronomical telescope along the same line of sight. The finderscope usually has a much smaller magnification than the main telescope, thus providing a larger field of view, useful for manually pointing (a.k.a. "slewing") the main telescope into a roughly correct direction that can easily place a desired astronomical object in view when zooming in. Some finderscopes have sophisticated reticles to more accurately aim the main telescope and/or even perform stadiametric measurements.

== Function and design ==
Finderscopes contain mechanisms to properly align them with the main telescope's line of sight. Accomplishing this alignment varies based on the design of the finderscope and its mount: usually on amateur telescopes it is done by three or six adjustment screws.

Finderscopes usually come with a designation of the form A×B, where A is the magnification and B is the aperture of the finderscope's objective lens in millimeters; for example, a 6×30 finderscope means a finderscope with a 30 mm objective and a magnification of 6×. This designation is in the same format used by most binoculars.

A 6×30 finderscope is typically considered the minimum useful size for a magnifying finderscope on an amateur telescope. An 8×50 or larger finderscope is preferred, which allows sighting of fainter objects.

Most finderscopes have one of three viewing orientations:

Type	Eyepiece mount	Image orientation
Standard	Straight through	Upside down and reversed (i.e. rotated 180 degrees)
Right-angle	90 degrees	Backwards (mirror-image)
RACI (Right-angle correct-image)	90 degrees	Correct

== Reflex sights ==
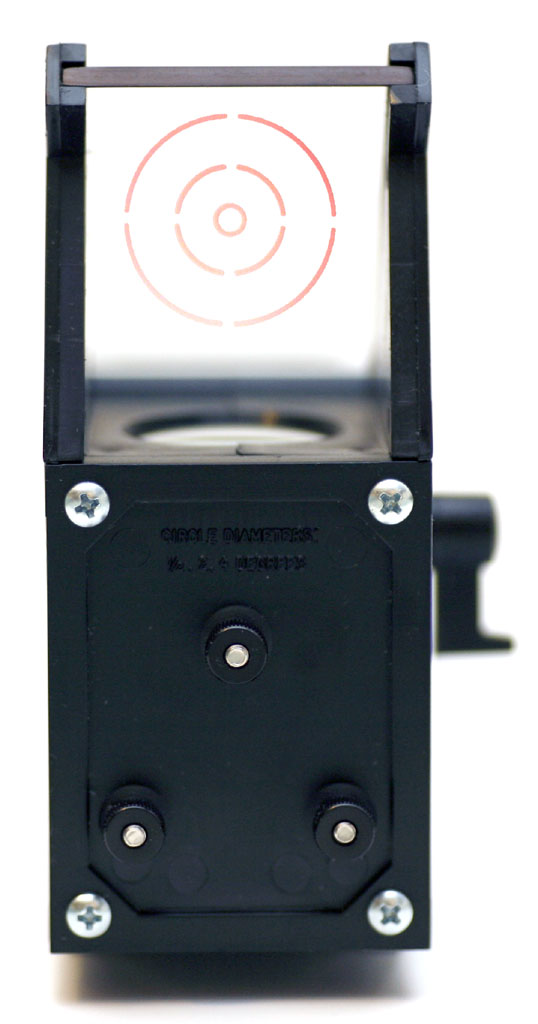
Reflex sights such as the Telrad (pictured) are popular alternatives to traditional finderscopes, and are often used in conjunction with them.

Another type of finder commonly found on amateur telescopes is known as a reflector (reflex) sight. This non-magnifying sight (technically not a "scope") uses a type of beam splitter to "reflect" a reticle generated by collimating optics into the users field of view. The view of the sky seen through the sight is just what can be seen with the naked eye with an illuminated crosshair or dot seeming to float in space at infinity. These crosshairs are generally illuminated by a small LED. Reflector sights are useful for locating bright objects visible to the naked eye such as stars and planets. Since the sight uses a beam splitter "window", instead of an optical telescope with the ability to gather light, objects dimmer than the naked eye limit can not be seen through it. Finding dim objects with a reflector sight is accomplished by using the object's known position relative to brighter objects as a reference and then slewing a known angular distance (or "star hopping") from the bright object to the desired object. Many reflector sights have circles with a given angular dimension in order to facilitate this. Reflector sights are less useful in light polluted areas since the stars used to guide the observer to a dim object may also be invisible.

== See also ==
- List of telescope parts and construction
- Viewfinder
