= Nikon Coolpix P5000 =

Digital camera model

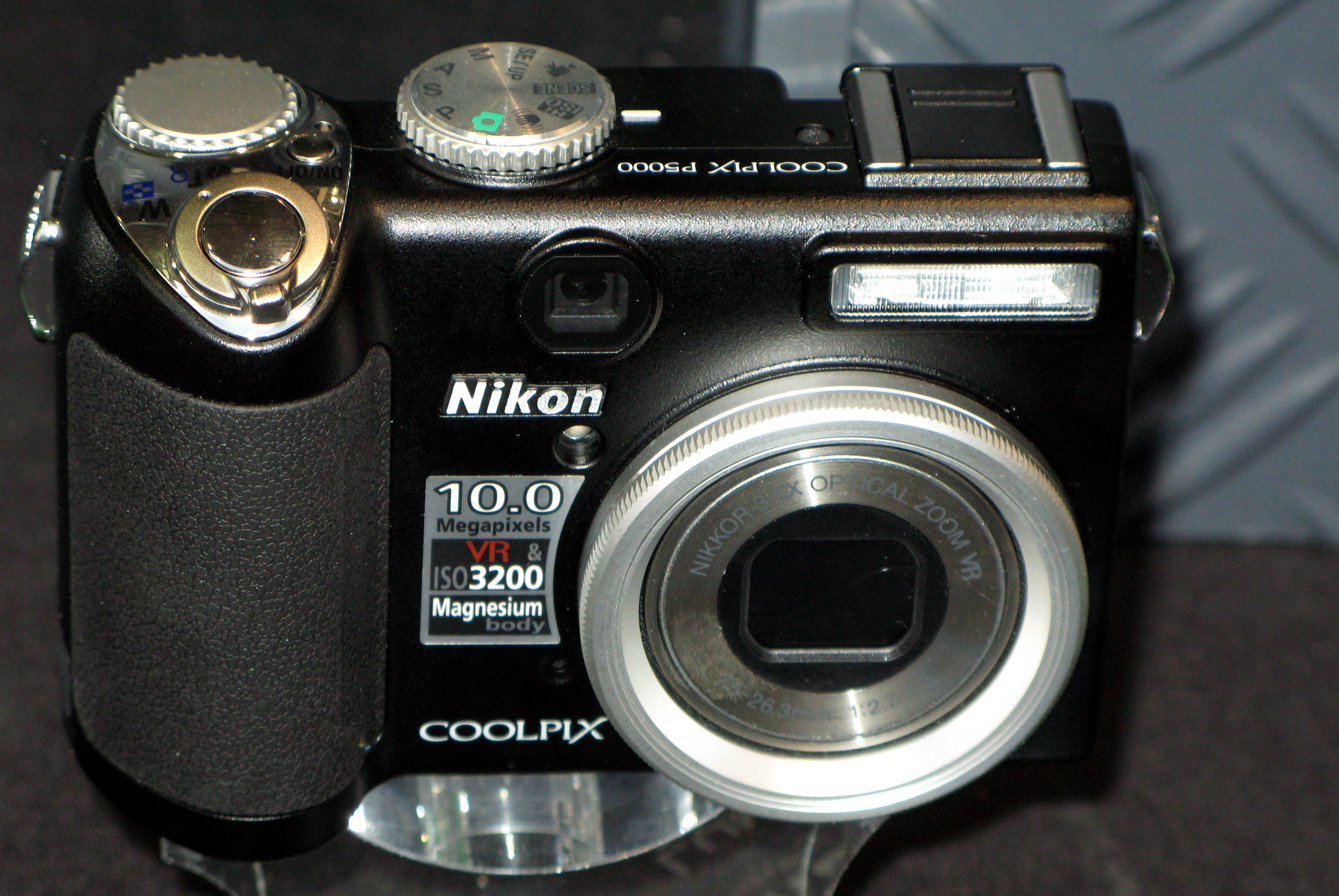

Overview
- Maker: Nikon
- Type: Compact camera

Lens
- Lens: 36–126 mm (24×36 mm equivalent), 4× digital zoom

Sensor/medium
- Sensor: CCD
- Maximum resolution: 10 million pixels, 3,648 × 2,736
- Film speed: 64–2000
- Storage media: SD/SDHC card + Internal, 26 MB internal

Viewfinder
- Viewfinder: Optical

General
- LCD screen: 6.3 cm (2.5 in), 230,000 pixels
- Battery: Nikon EN-EL5 Lithium-Ion
- Optional battery packs: $363
- Weight: 200 g (7.1 oz)
- Made in: Indonesia

The Coolpix P5000 is a compact digital camera produced by Nikon. In 2007, it won the TIPA award for Best Compact Digital Camera and the American Photo Editor's Choice award. The P5000 was released in March 2007.
