= Diurnal motion =

Apparent motion of celestial objects around Earth

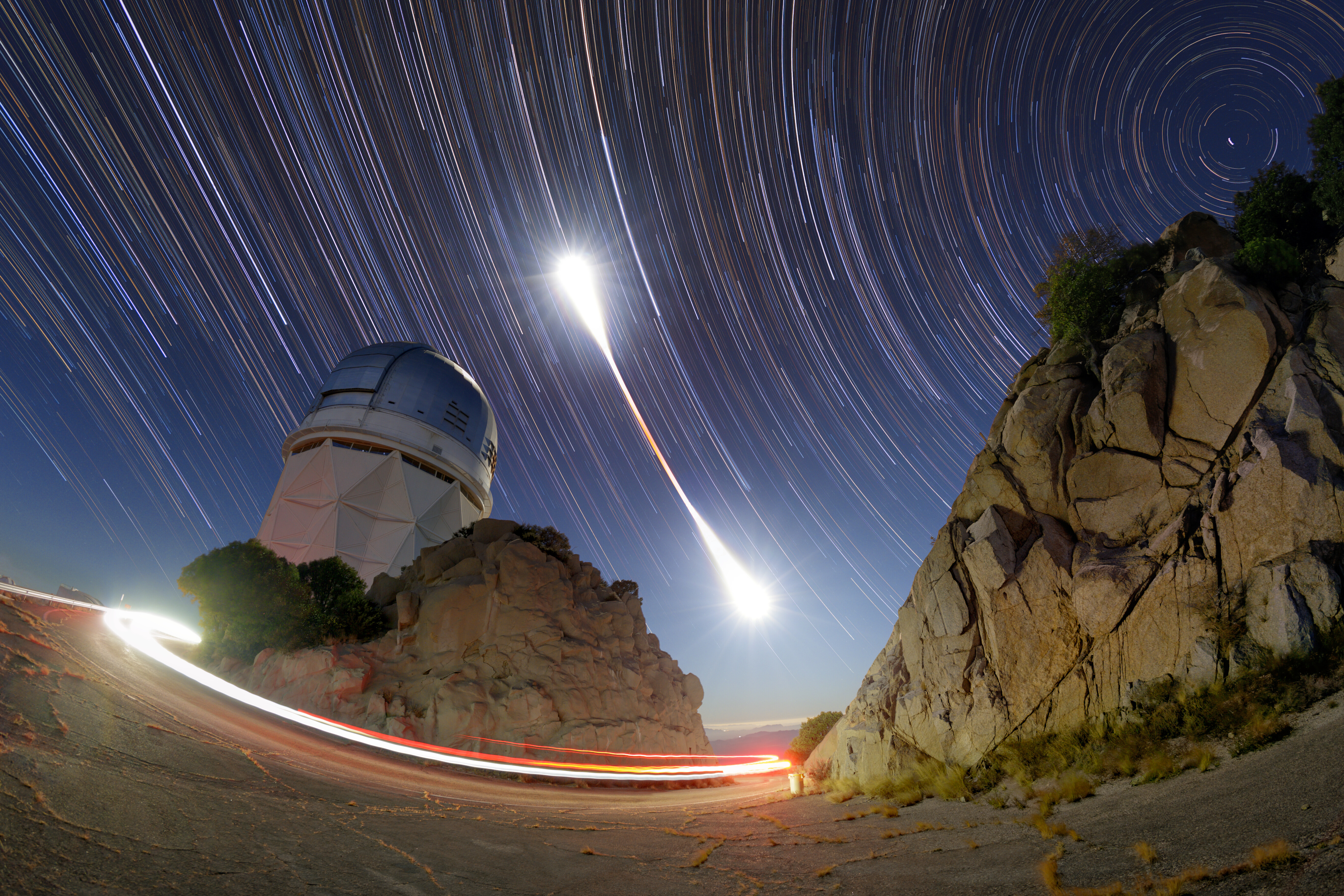
Star trails captured during a total lunar eclipse

In astronomy, diurnal motion (from Latin diurnus 'daily', from Latin diēs 'day') is the apparent motion of celestial objects (e.g. the Sun and stars) around Earth, or more precisely around the two celestial poles, over the course of one day. It is caused by Earth's rotation around its axis, so almost every star appears to follow a circular arc path, called the diurnal circle, often depicted in star trail photography.

The time for one complete rotation is 23 hours, 56 minutes, and 4.09 seconds – one sidereal day. The first experimental demonstration of this motion was conducted by Léon Foucault. Because Earth orbits the Sun once a year, the sidereal time at any given place and time will gain about four minutes against local civil time, every 24 hours, until, after a year has passed, one additional sidereal "day" has elapsed compared to the number of solar days that have gone by.

== Relative direction ==
Diurnal motion of the sky on the December solstice at 43°N ( Bilbao, Milwaukee, Sapporo, Vladivostok). The stars represented are: α Cma, α Car, α Boo, α Lyr, α Aur, α Cmi, α Eri, α Ori, α Aql, α Sco, α PsA, α Cyg. α Uma, α Umi and α Ari

The relative direction of diurnal motion in the Northern Celestial Hemisphere are as follows:

- Facing north, below Polaris: rightward, or eastward
- Facing north, above Polaris: leftward, or westward
- Facing south: rightward, or westward

Thus, northern circumpolar stars move counter clockwise around Polaris, the north pole star.

At the North Pole, the cardinal directions do not apply to diurnal motion. Within the circumpolar circle, all the stars move simply rightward, or looking directly overhead, counterclockwise around the zenith, where Polaris is.

Southern Celestial Hemisphere observers are to replace north with south, left with right, and Polaris with Sigma Octantis, sometimes called the south pole star. The circumpolar stars move clockwise around Sigma Octantis. East and west are not interchanged.

As seen from the Equator, the two celestial poles are on the horizon due north and south, and the motion is counterclockwise (i.e. leftward) around Polaris and clockwise (i.e. rightward) around Sigma Octantis. All motion is westward, except for the two fixed points.

== Apparent speed ==
The daily arc path of an object on the celestial sphere, including the possible part below the horizon, has a length proportional to the cosine of the declination. Thus, the speed of the diurnal motion of a celestial object equals this cosine times 15° per hour, 15 arcminutes per minute, or 15 arcseconds per second.

Per a certain period of time, a given angular distance travelled by an object along or near the celestial equator may be compared to the angular diameter of one of the following objects:

- up to one Sun or Moon diameter (about 0.5° or 30') every 2 minutes
- up to one diameter of the planet Venus in inferior conjunction (about 1' or 60") about every 4 seconds
- 2,000 diameters of the largest stars per second

Star trail and time-lapse photography capture diurnal motion blur. The apparent motion of stars near the celestial pole seems slower than that of stars closer to the celestial equator. Conversely, following the diurnal motion with the camera to eliminate its arcing effect on a long exposure, can best be done with an equatorial mount, which requires adjusting the right ascension only; a telescope may have a sidereal motor drive to do that automatically.

== Variations according to latitude and time of year ==
The diurnal motion is different in places of different latitudes and within each latitude according to the time of year, as can be seen in the following images.

The variations according to latitude at a given time can be seen in the first three images.

Diurnal motion on the December solstice according to latitude

at 80ºN

at 43ºN

at 10ºN

-

The following four images show diurnal motion at 43ºN on different times

Diurnal motion at 43ºN at different times

on March equinox

on June solstice

on September equinox

on December solstice

-

== See also ==
- Direction determination
- Position of the Sun
