= Star trail =

Type of long exposure photograph

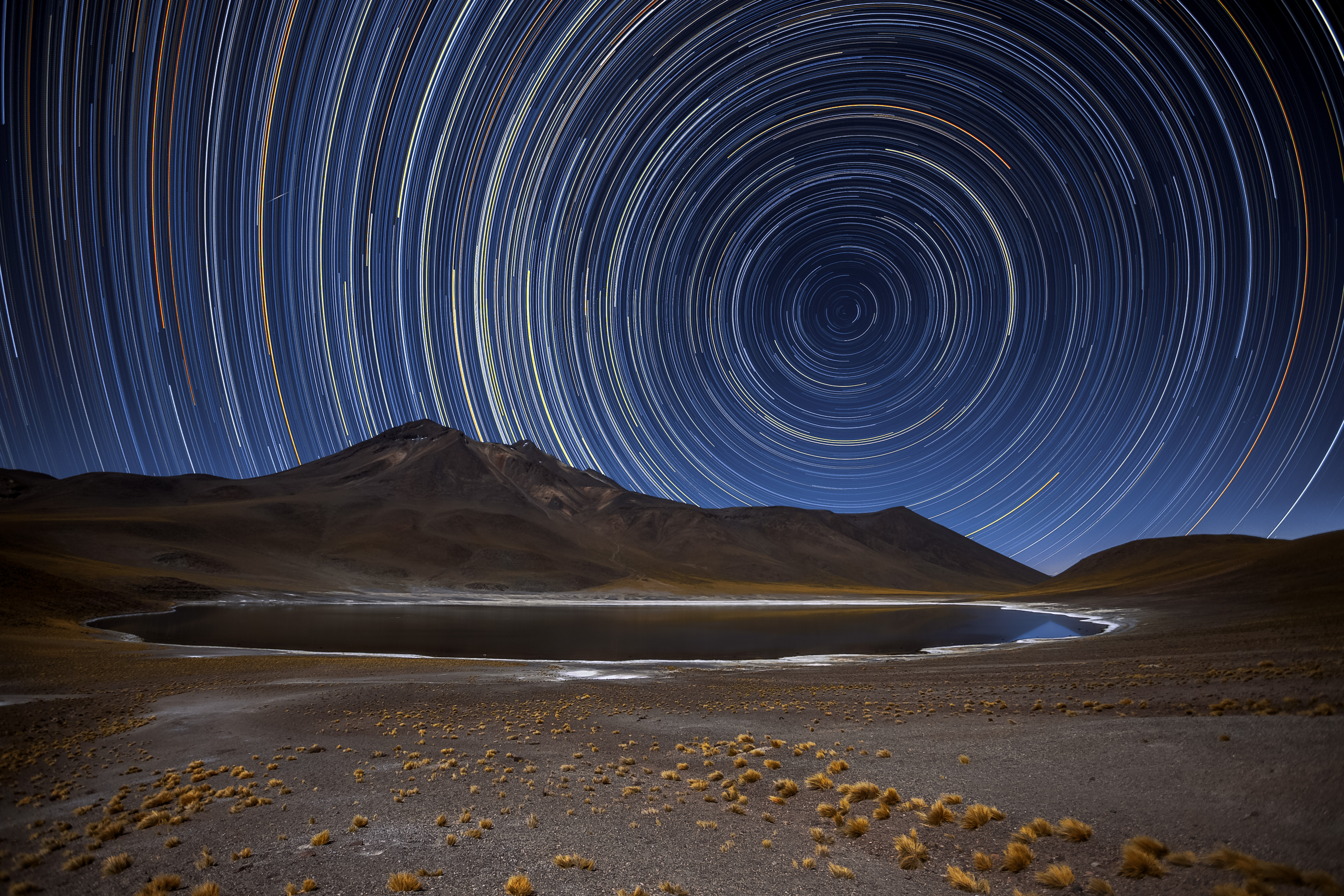
All the stars in the night sky appear to circle the celestial pole (the south pole in this photo). Over a period of several hours, this apparent motion leaves star trails.

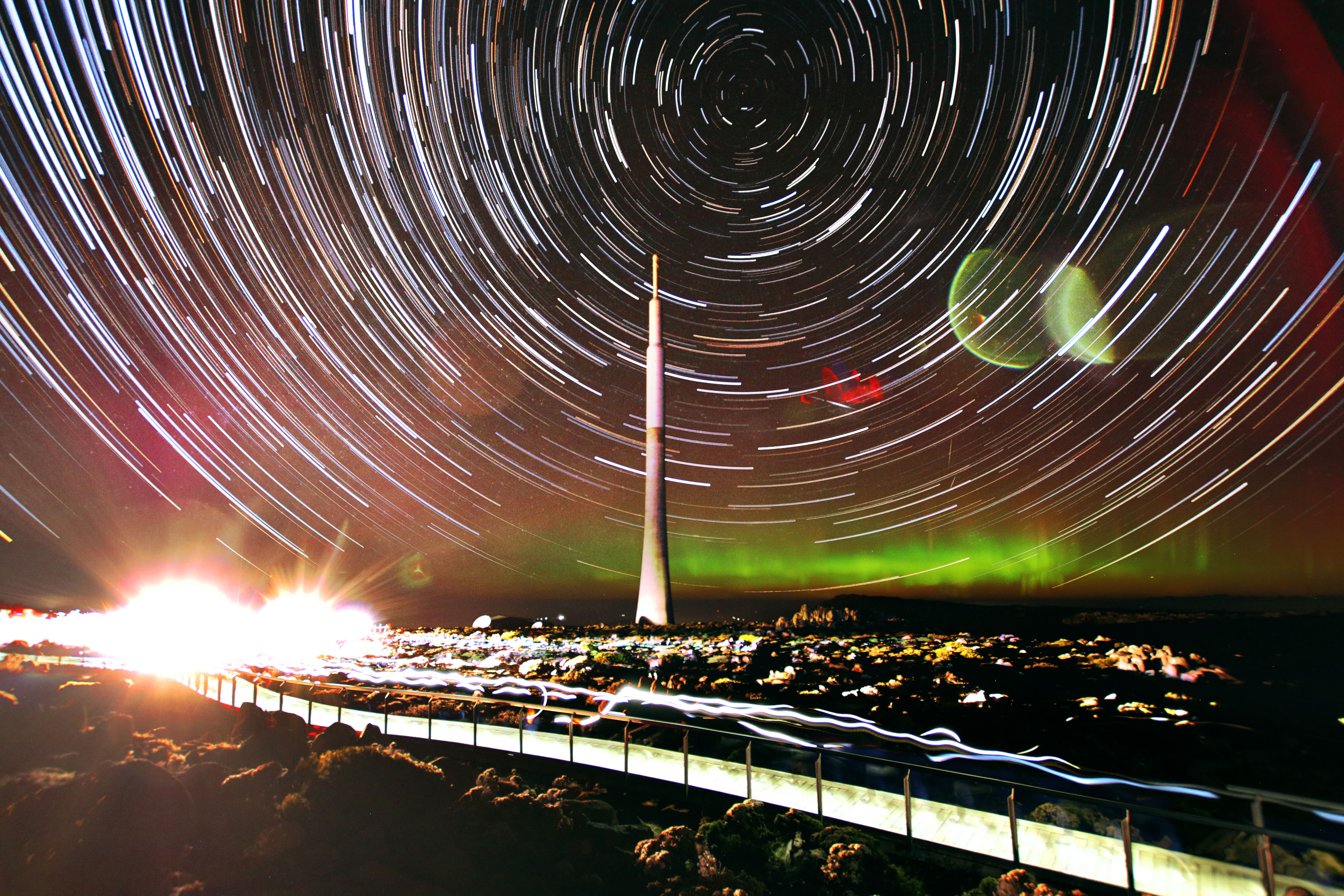
Star trail photographed from Mount Wellington, Tasmania. Aurora australis visible in the background.

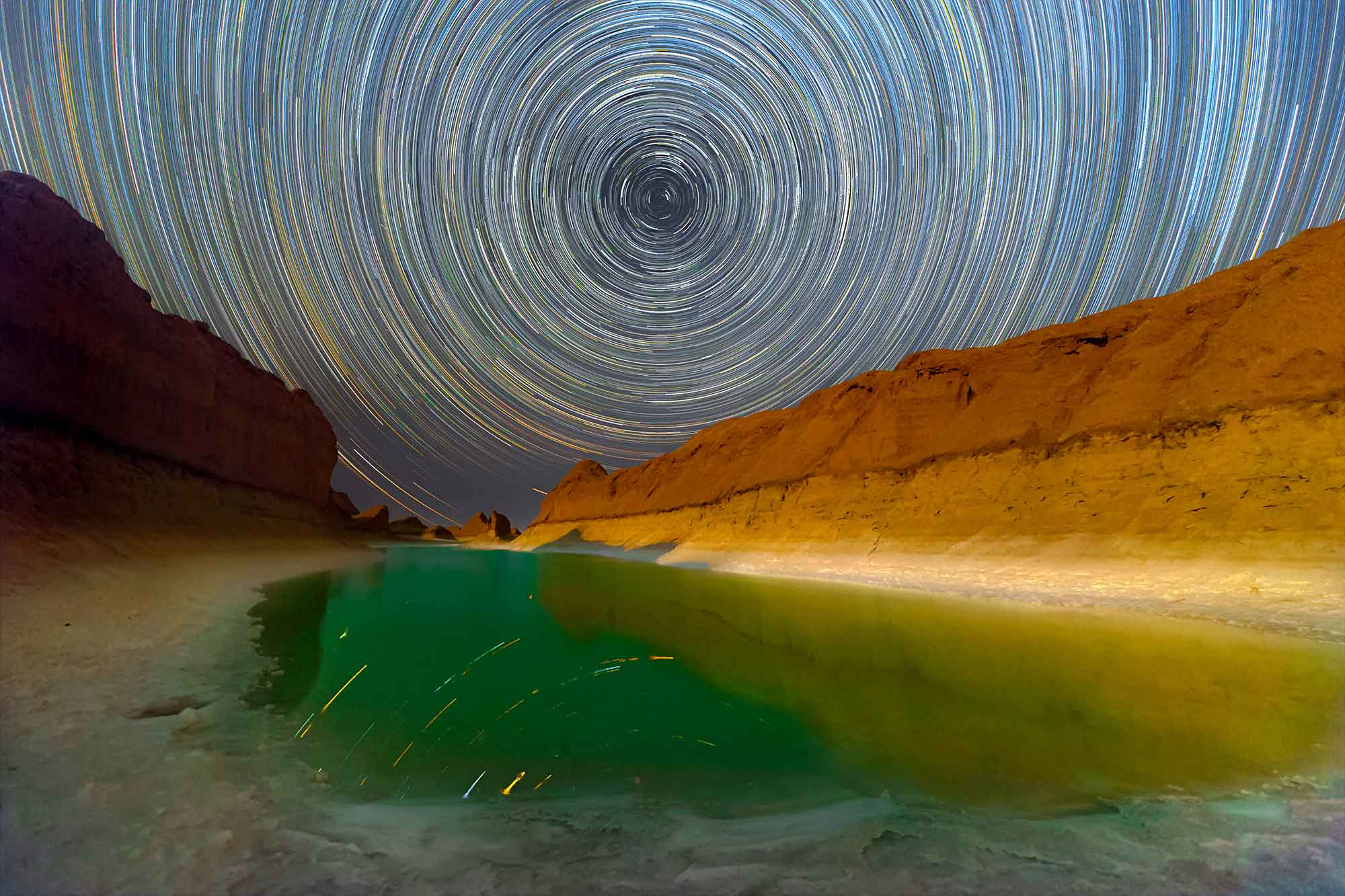
Star trail photography on salt lake in Lut desert in Iran

A star trail is a type of photograph that uses long exposure times to capture diurnal circles, the apparent motion of stars in the night sky due to Earth's rotation. A star-trail photograph shows individual stars as streaks across the image, with longer exposures yielding longer arcs. The term is used for similar photos captured elsewhere, such as on board the International Space Station and on Mars.

Typical shutter speeds for a star trail range from 15 minutes to several hours, requiring a "Bulb" setting on the camera to open the shutter for a period longer than usual. However, a more practiced technique is to blend a number of frames together to create the final star trail image.

Star trails have been used by professional astronomers to measure the quality of observing locations for major telescopes.

== Capture ==
Video of star trails

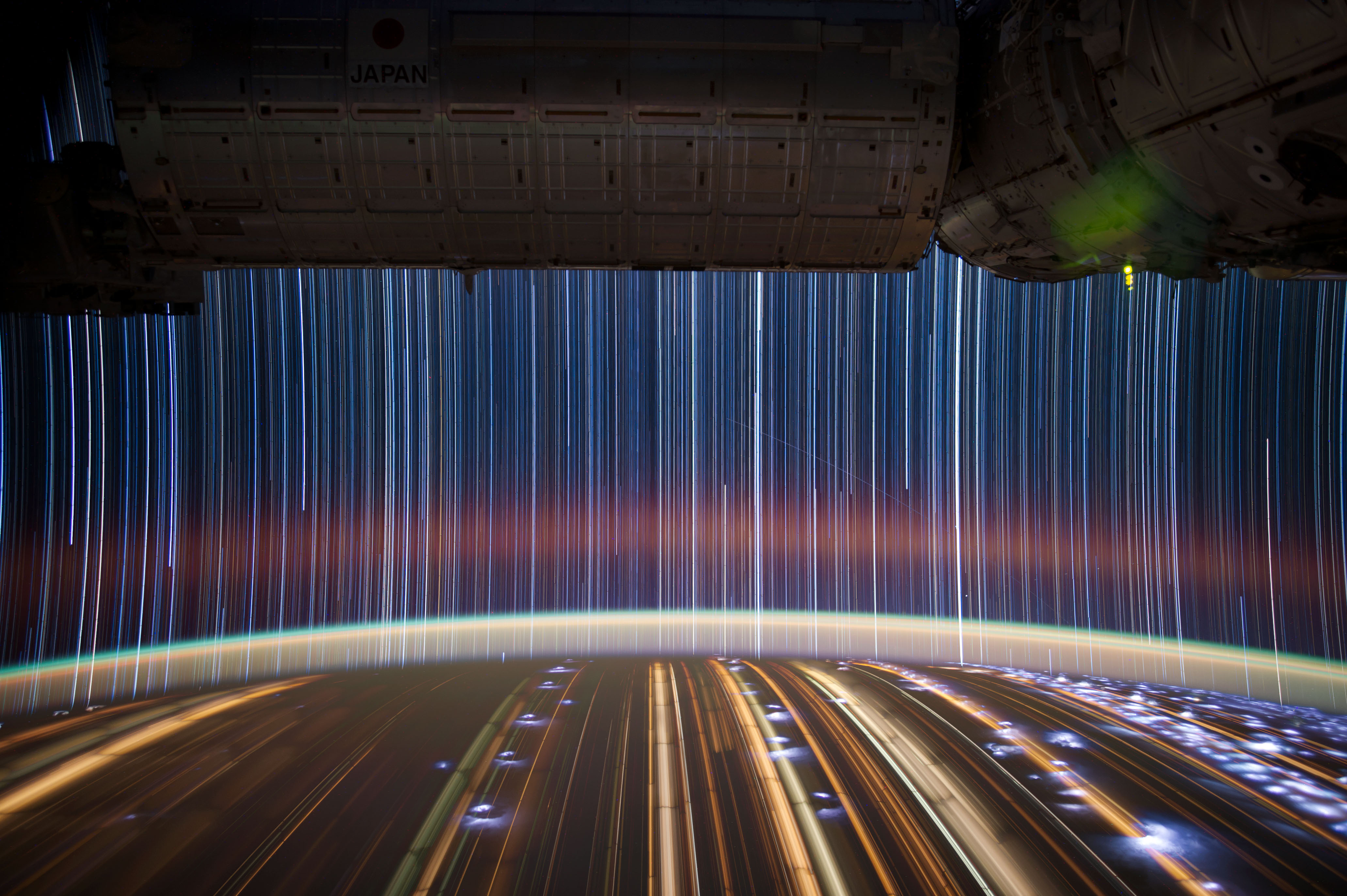
Star trails photographed from the International Space Station in low Earth orbit at an angle that makes the trails almost vertical instead of circular.

Star trail photographs are captured by placing a camera on a tripod, pointing the lens toward the night sky, and allowing the shutter to stay open for a long period of time. Star trails are considered relatively easy for amateur astrophotographers to create. Photographers generally make these images by using a DSLR or Mirrorless camera with its lens focus set to infinity. A cable release or intervalometer allows the photographer to hold the shutter open for the desired amount of time. Typical exposure times range from 15 minutes to many hours long, depending on the desired length of the star trail arcs for the image. Even though star trail pictures are created under low-light conditions, long exposure times allow fast films, such as ISO 200 and ISO 400. Wide-apertures, such as f/5.6 and f/4, are recommended for star trails.

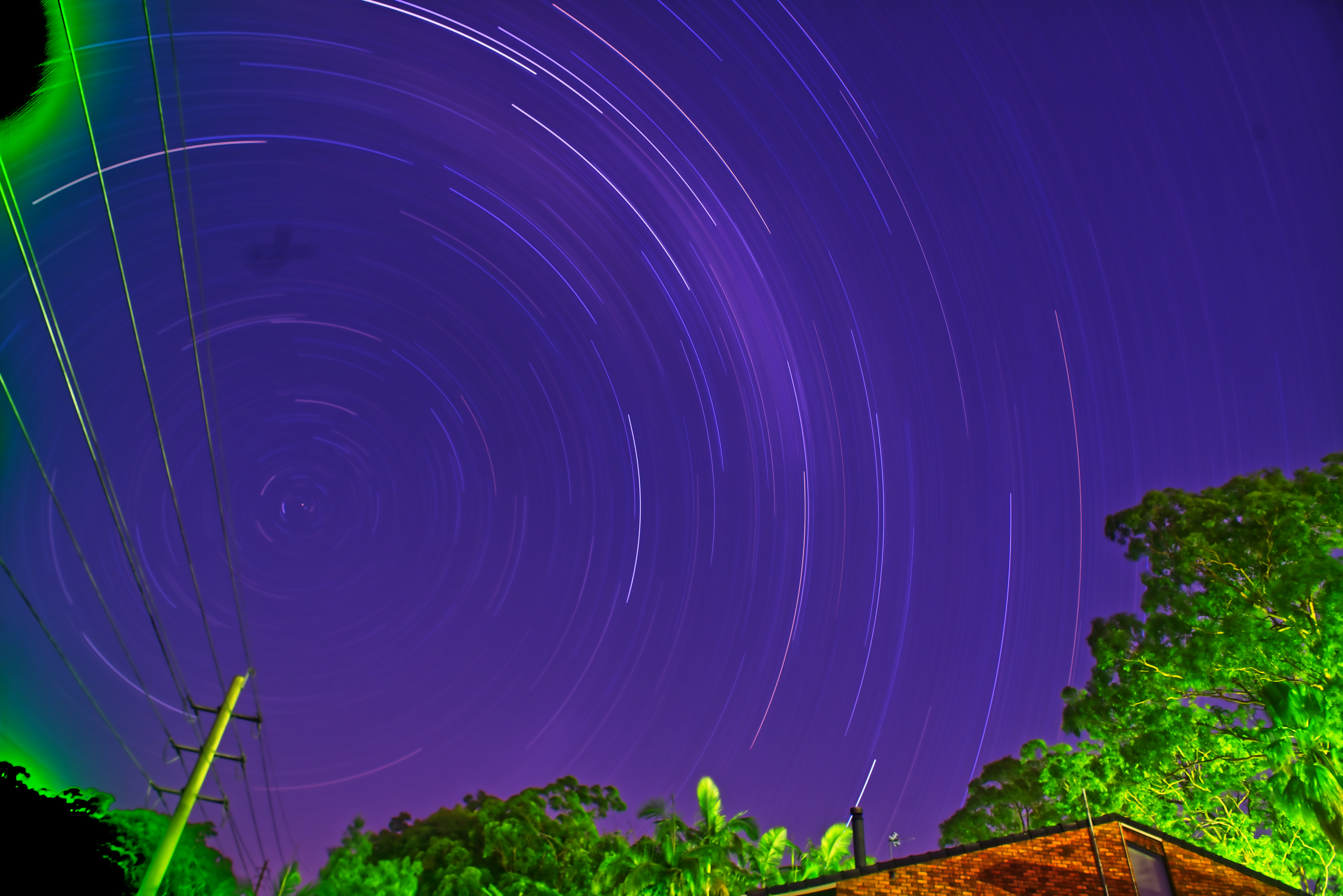
The star trails captured with 136 minutes long period of exposure in Eleebana, NSW, Australia on 3 March 2019

Because exposure times for star trail photographs can be several hours long, camera batteries can be easily depleted. Mechanical cameras that do not require a battery to open and close the shutter have an advantage over more modern film and digital cameras that rely on battery power. On these cameras, the Bulb, or B, exposure setting keeps the shutter open. Another problem that digital cameras encounter is an increase in electronic noise with increasing exposure time. However, this can be avoided through the use of shorter exposure times that are then stacked in post production software. This avoids possible heat build up or digital noise caused from a single long exposure.

American astronaut Don Pettit recorded star trails with a digital camera from the International Space Station in Earth orbit between April and June, 2012. Pettit described his technique as follows: "My star trail images are made by taking a time exposure of about 10 to 15 minutes. However, with modern digital cameras, 30 seconds is about the longest exposure possible, due to electronic detector noise effectively snowing out the image. To achieve the longer exposures I do what many amateur astronomers do. I take multiple 30-second exposures, then 'stack' them using imaging software, thus producing the longer exposure."

Star trail images have also been taken on Mars. The Spirit rover produced them while looking for meteors. Since the camera was limited to 60 second exposures the trails appear as dashed lines.

== Earth's rotation ==
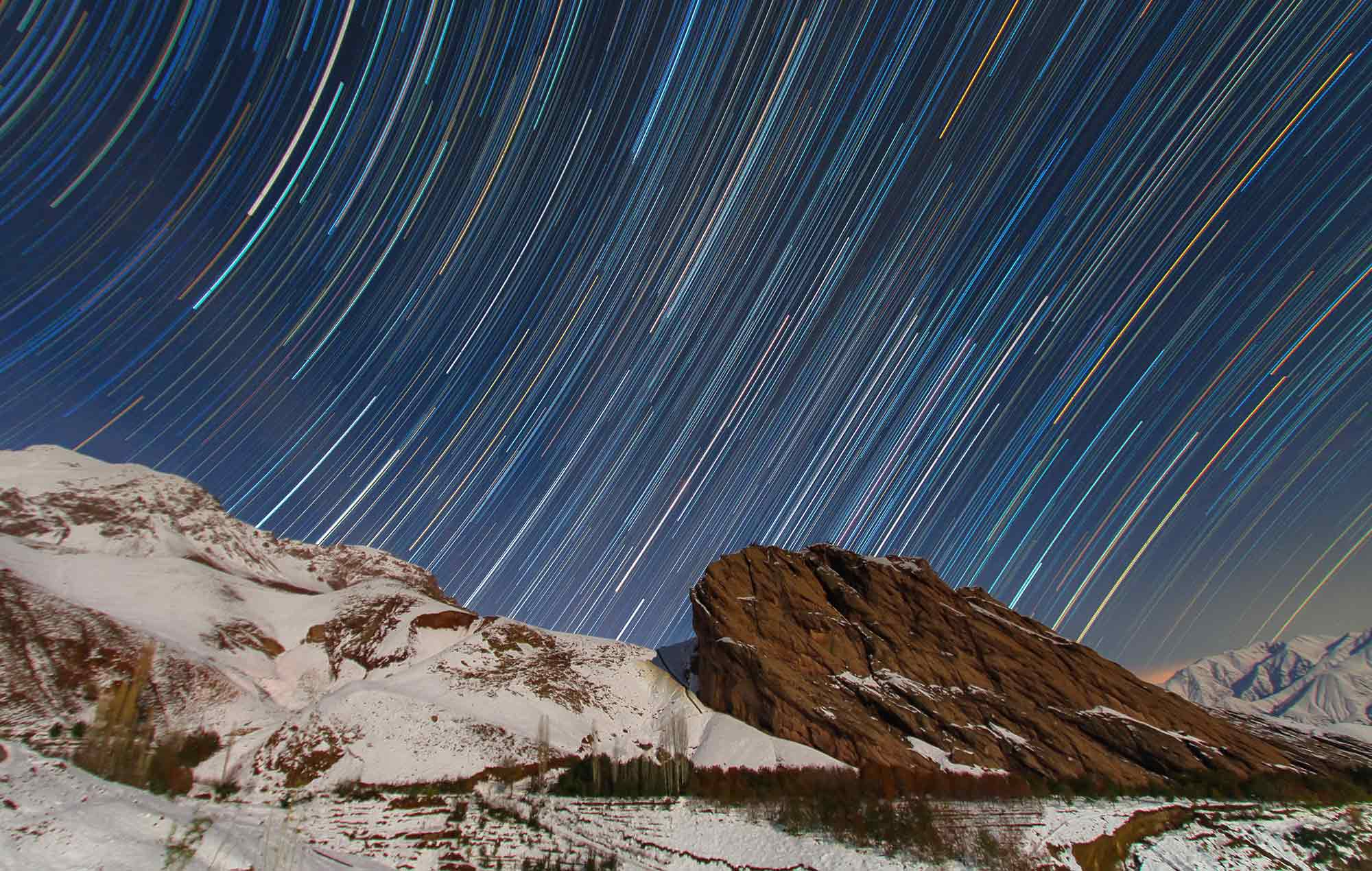
Star trail over the rocky mountain in Alamut, Qazvin, Iran

Star trail photographs are possible because of the rotation of Earth about its axis. The apparent motion of the stars is recorded as mostly curved streaks on the film or detector. For observers in the Northern Hemisphere, aiming the camera northward creates an image with concentric circular arcs centered on the north celestial pole (very near Polaris). For those in the Southern Hemisphere, this same effect is achieved by aiming the camera southward. In this case, the arc streaks are centered on the south celestial pole (near Sigma Octantis). Aiming the camera eastward or westward shows straight streaks on the celestial equator, which is tilted at angle with respect to the horizon. The angular measure of this tilt depends on the photographer's latitude (L), and is equal to 90° − L.

== Astronomical site testing ==
Star trail photographs can be used by astronomers to determine the quality of a location for telescope observations. Star trail observations of Polaris have been used to measure the quality of seeing in the atmosphere, and the vibrations in telescope mounting systems. The first recorded suggestion of this technique is from E.S. Skinner's 1931 book A Manual of Celestial Photography.

== Gallery ==
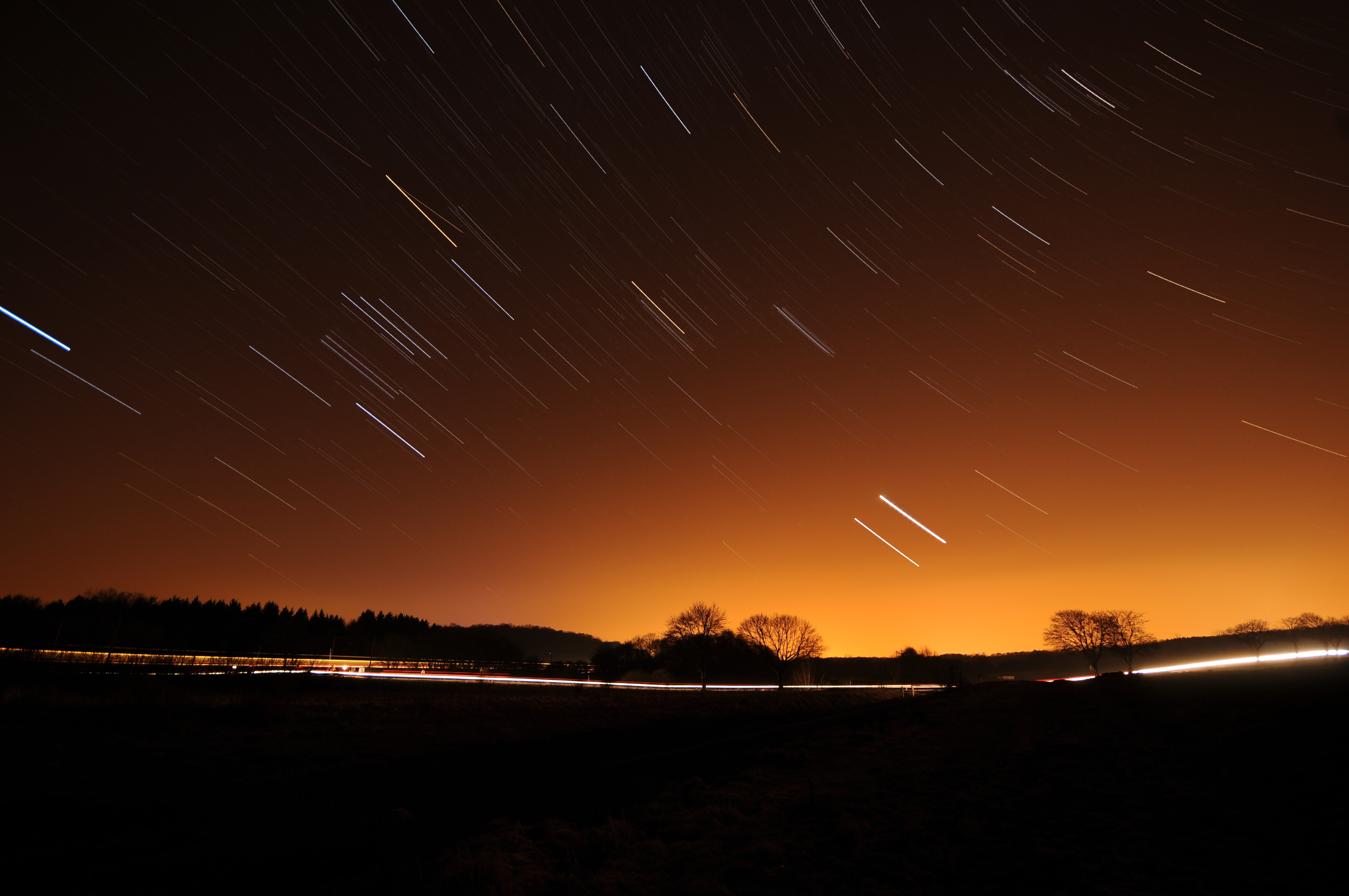
Star trails photographed by facing northwest.

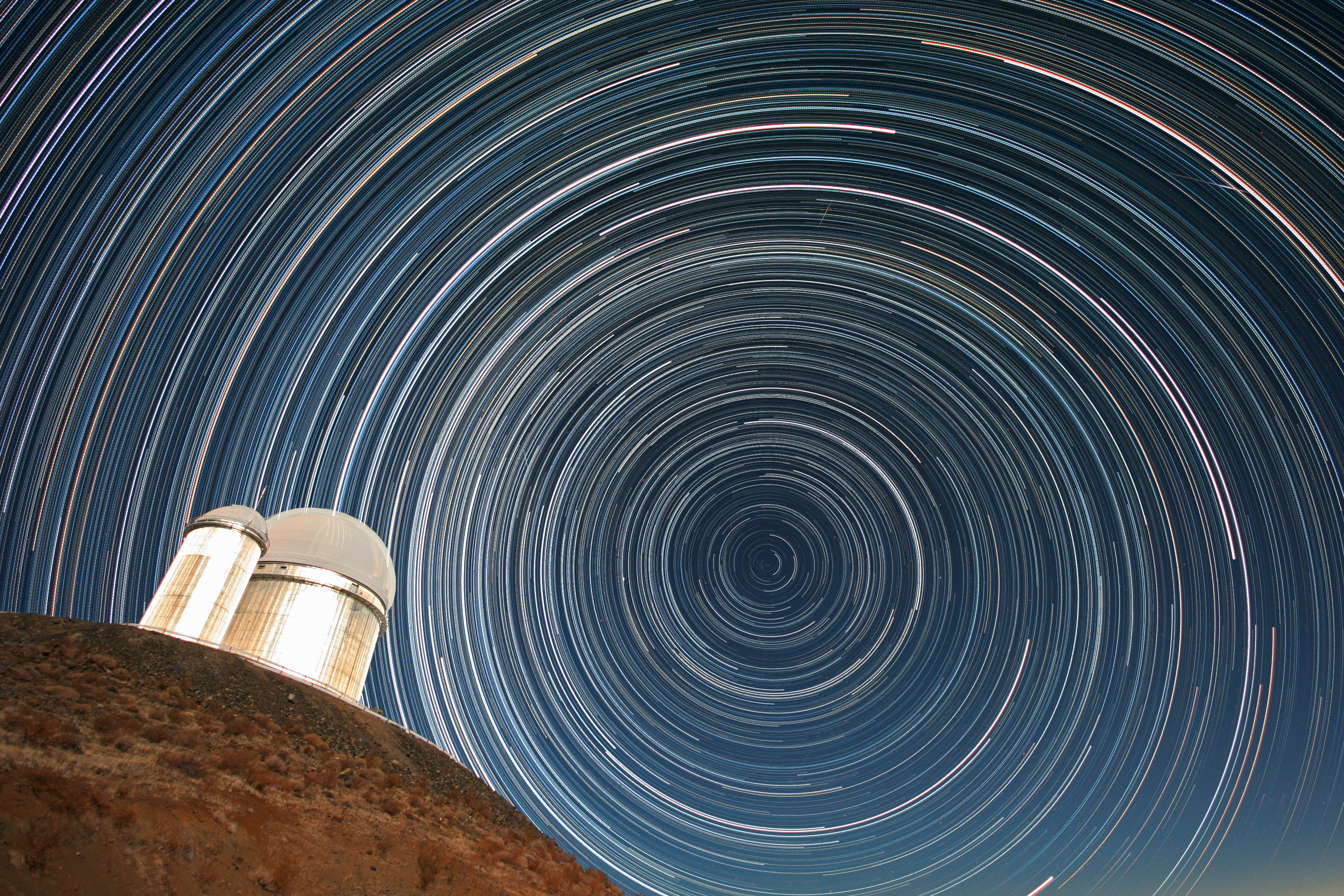
Star trails over the ESO 3.6 m Telescope.

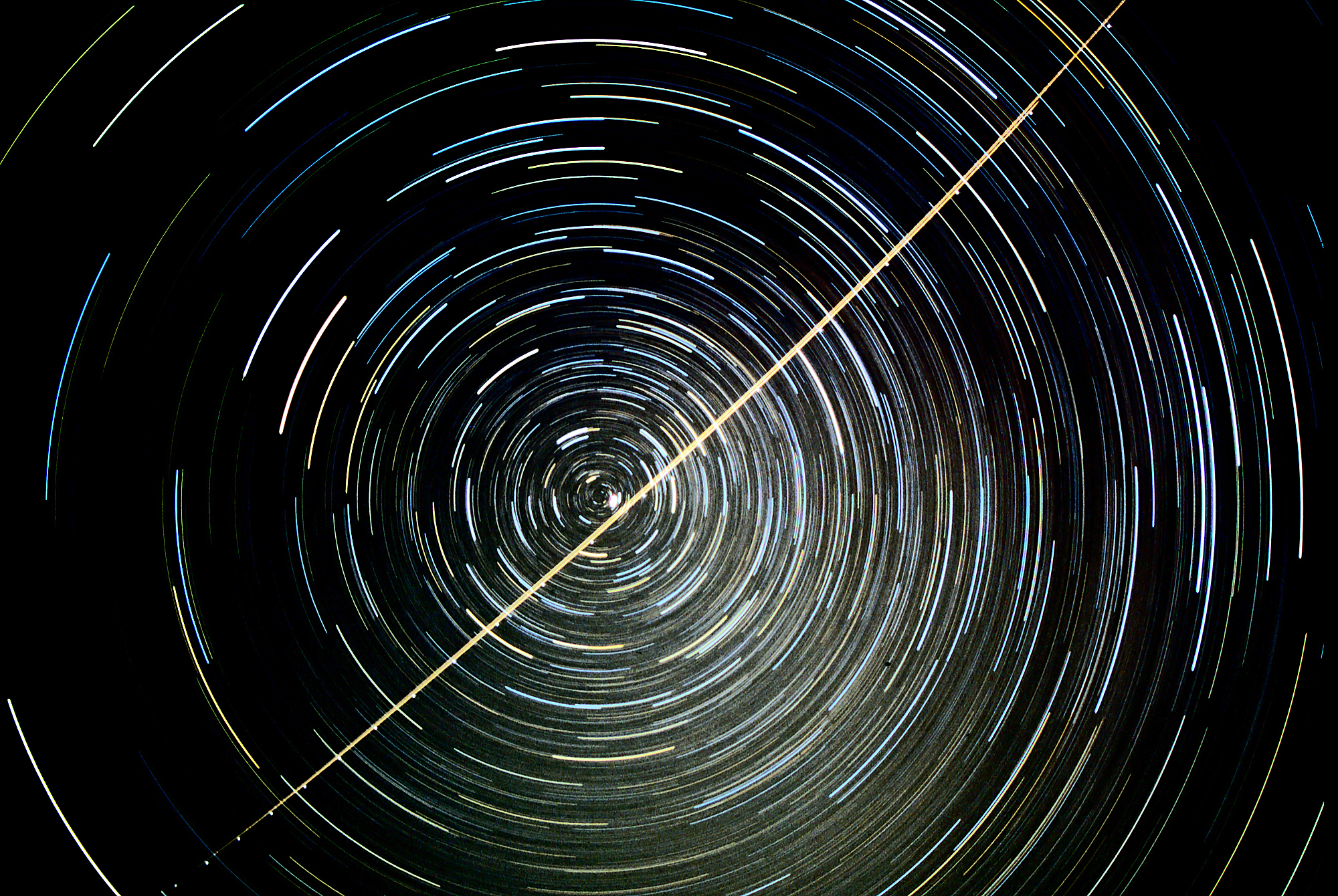
A star trail photograph showing the apparent motion of stars around the north celestial pole; Polaris is the bright star near the pole, just above the jet trail.

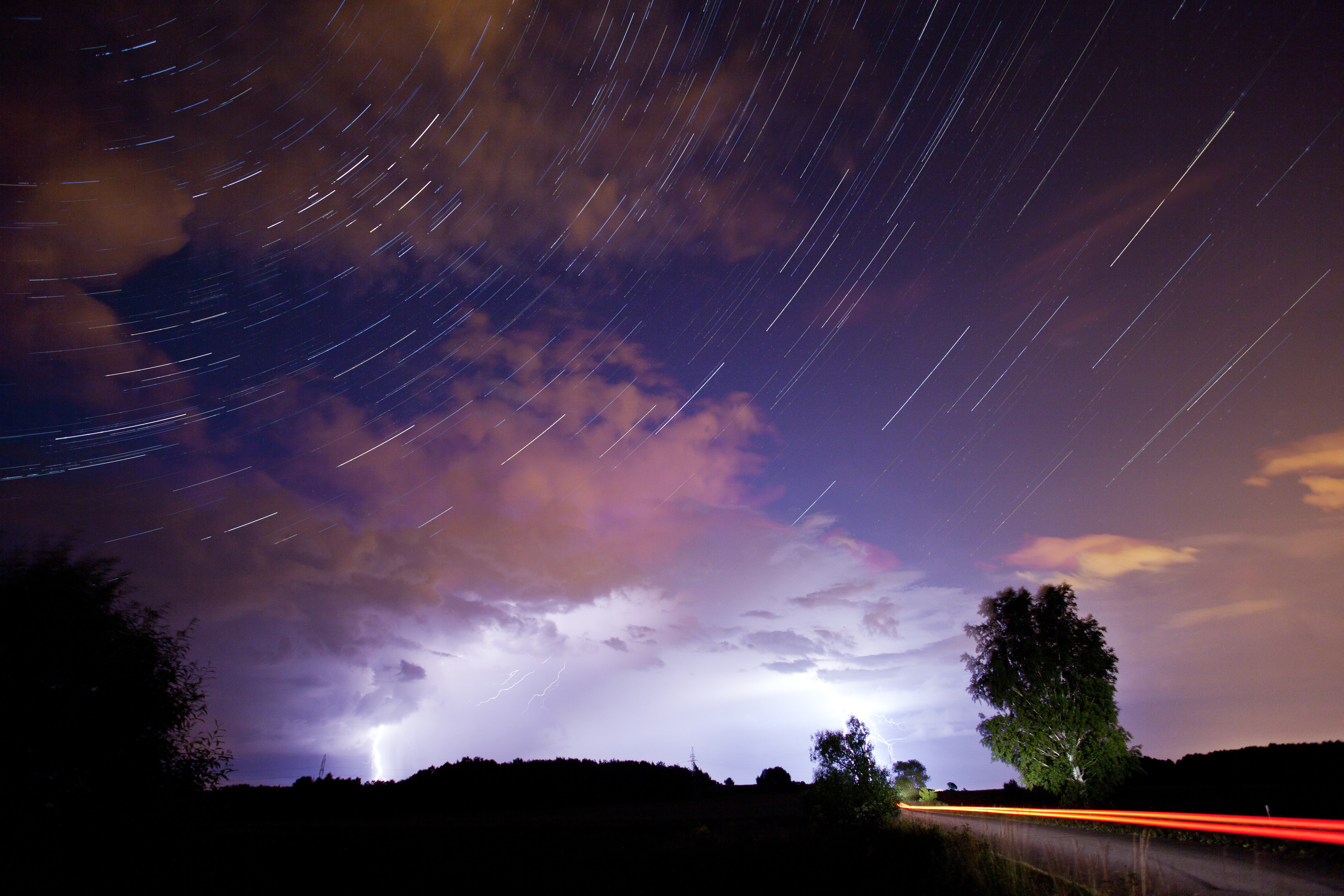
The constellation of Cassiopeia over a thunderstorm.

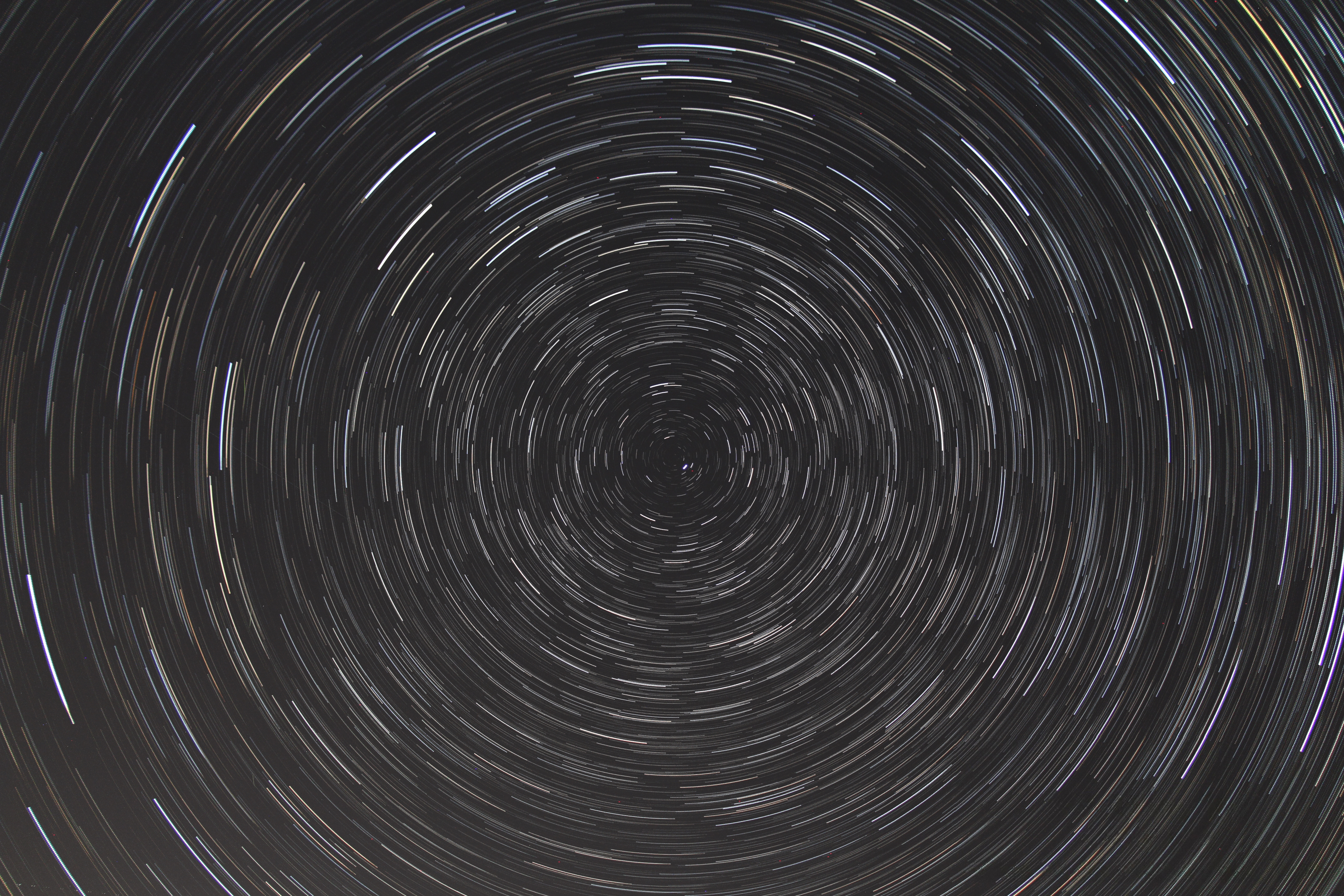
Startrail shot in Waterworks Prairie Park, Iowa.

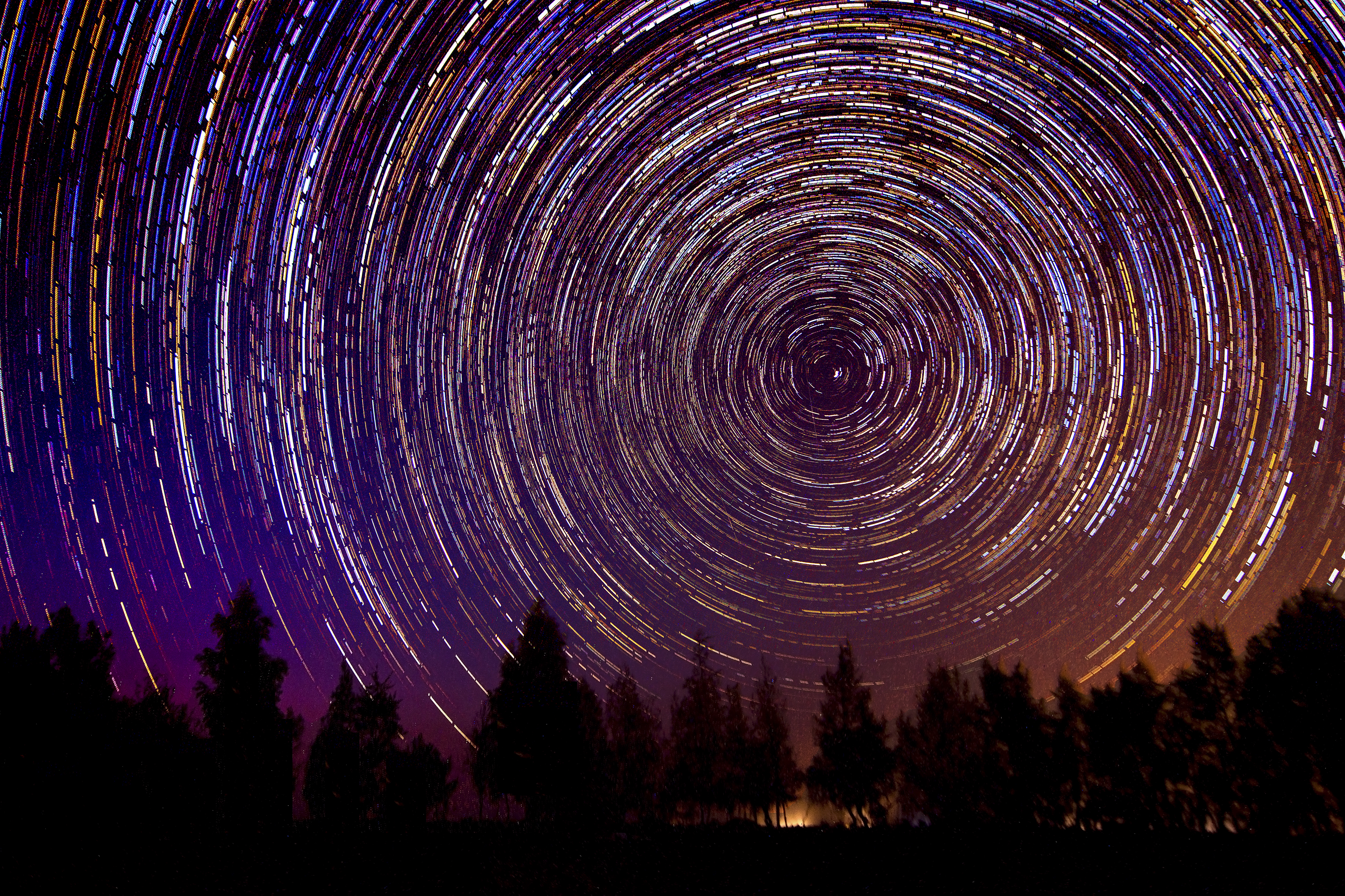
Startrail in Fayyoum, Egypt.

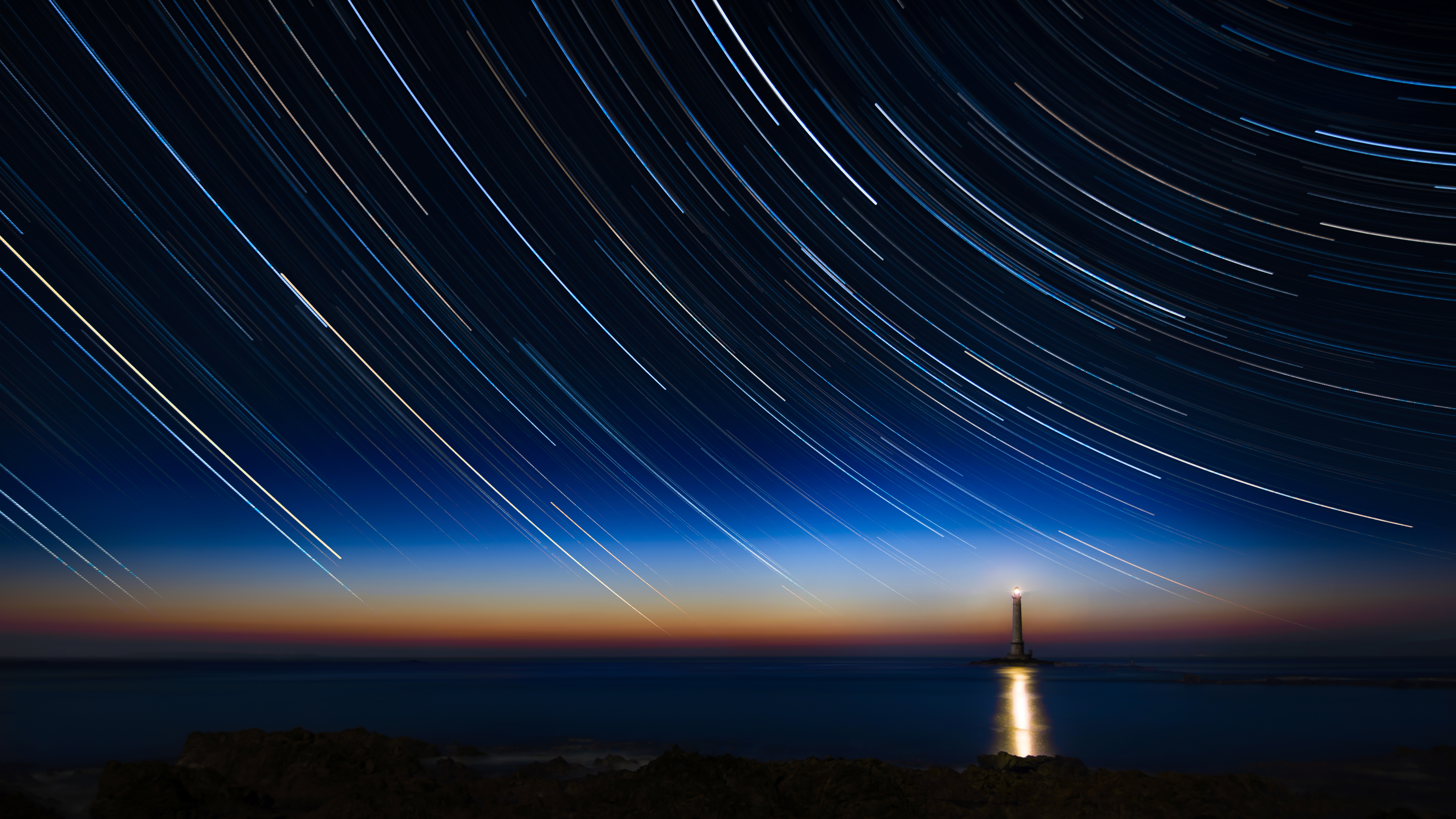
Circumpolar stars in star trails at the La Hague lighthouse, France.

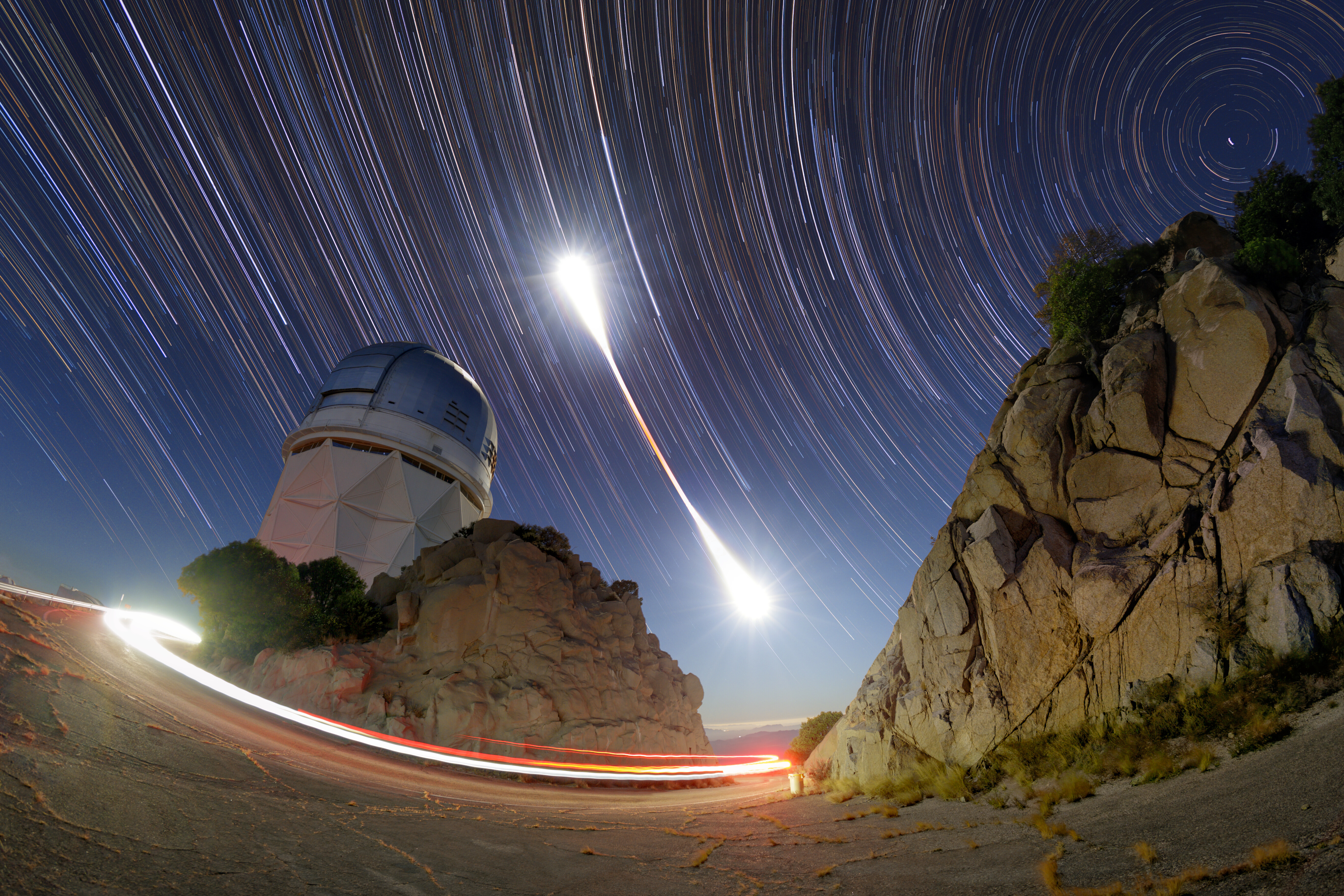
Star trails captured during a total lunar eclipse.
