= Long-exposure photography =

Photography using a long-duration shutter speed

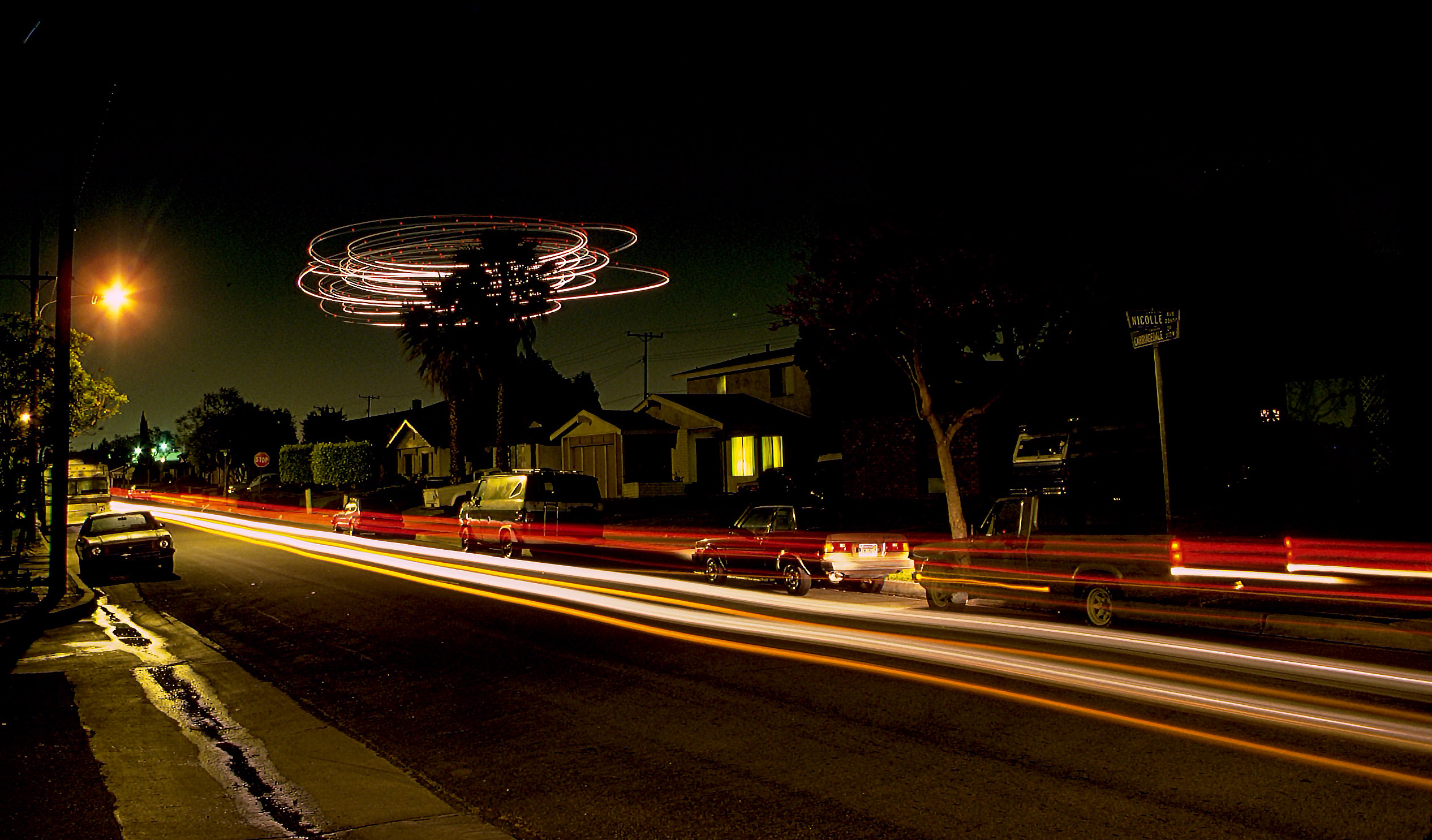
A long-exposure photograph of a street in Carson, California, 1986. The trails along the street are from headlights and taillights, while the circles in the sky are from a police helicopter.

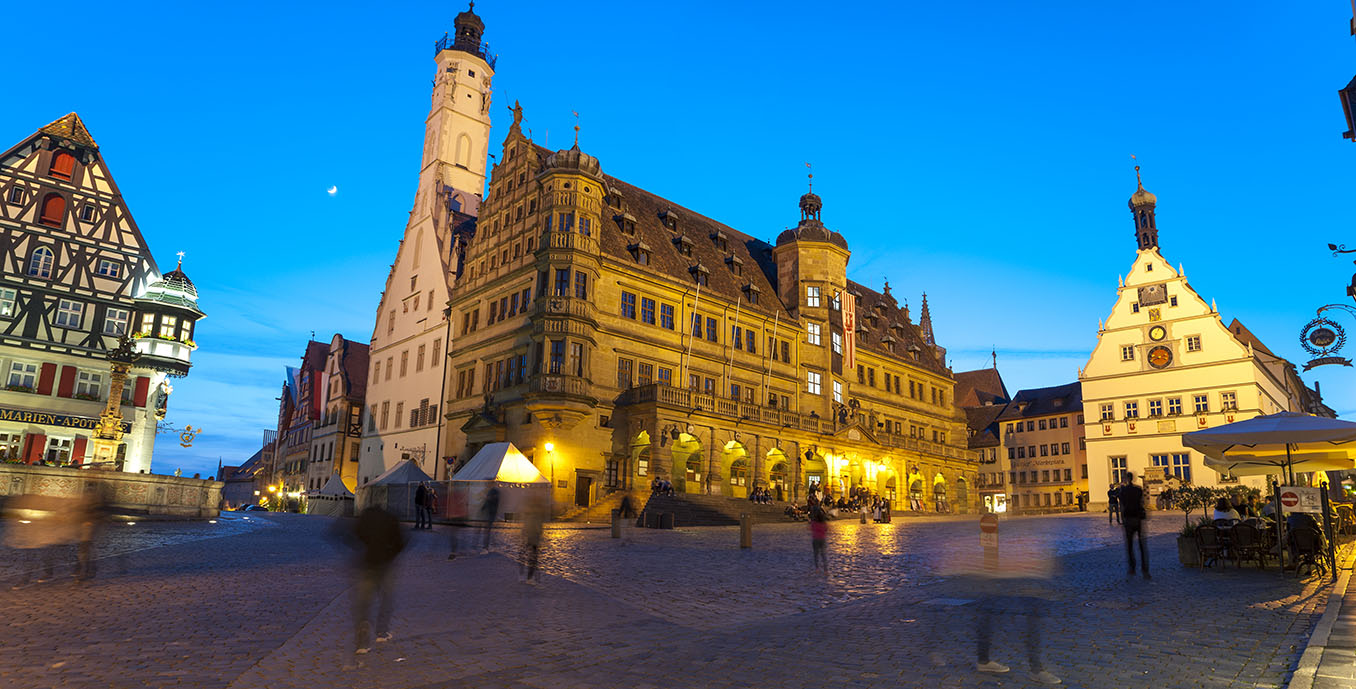
The central square of Rothenburg ob der Tauber, Germany, during blue hour. Notice how a long exposure blurs moving vehicles and pedestrians while buildings retain sharp focus.

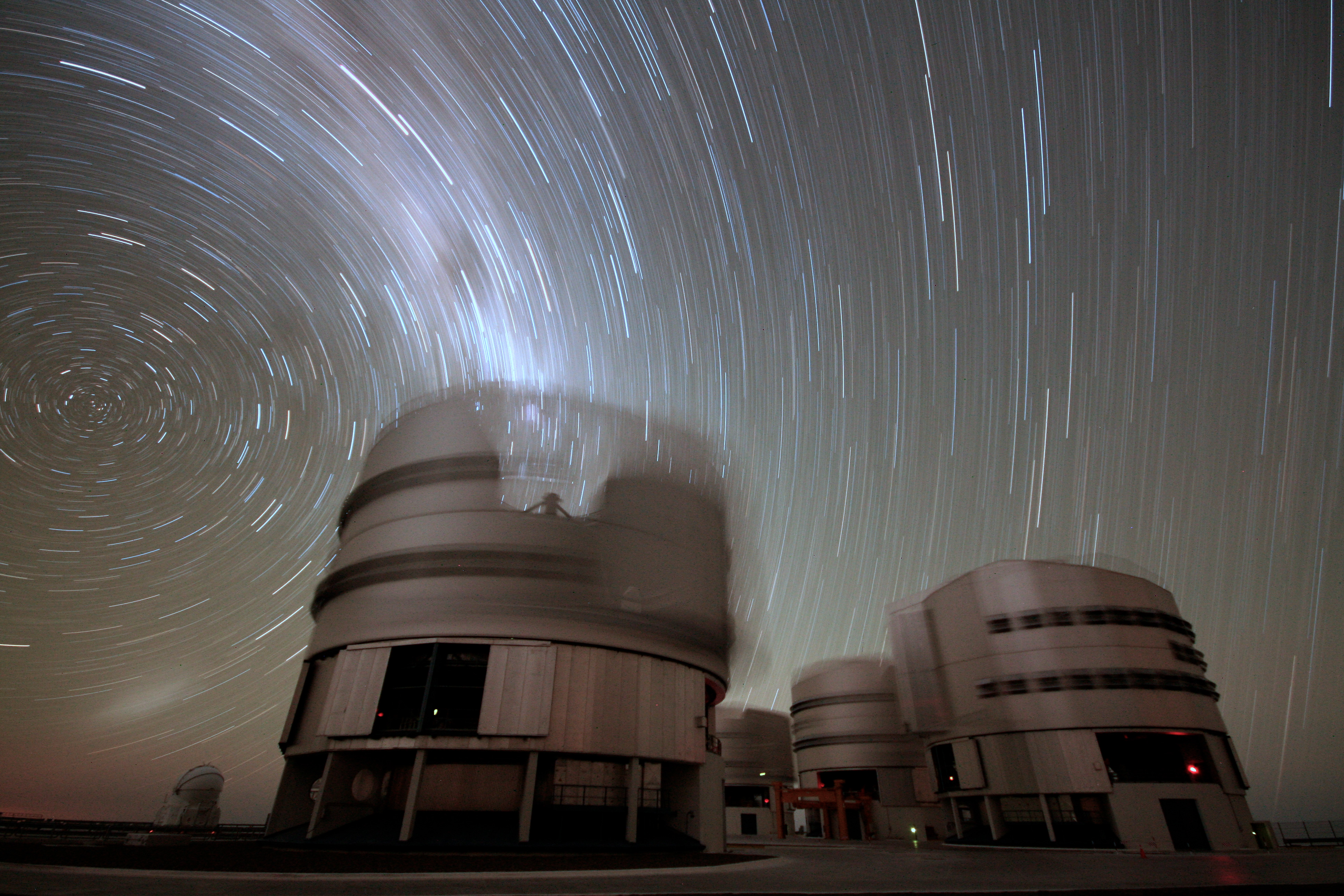
In this 45-minute exposure taken on a dark clear night at Paranal Observatory, the stars leave trails as they appear to revolve around the south celestial pole (left), due to Earth's rotation.

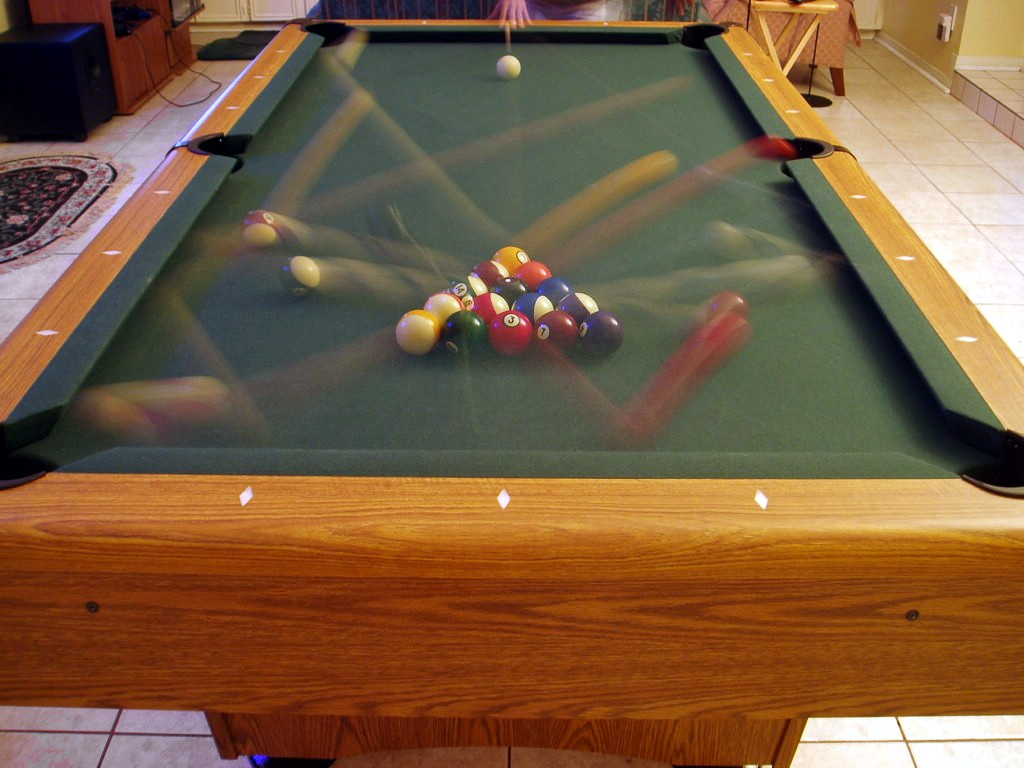
Long-exposure photograph of a break in pool

Long-exposure, time-exposure, or slow-shutter photography involves using a long-duration shutter speed to sharply capture the stationary elements of images while blurring, smearing, or obscuring the moving elements. Long-exposure photography captures one element that conventional photography does not: an extended period of time.

The paths of bright moving objects become clearly visible—clouds form broad bands, vehicle lights draw bright streaks, stars leave trails in the sky, and water waves appear smooth. Only bright objects leave visible trails, whereas dark objects usually disappear. Boats in long exposures disappear during the daytime, but draw bright trails from their lights at night.

== Technique ==
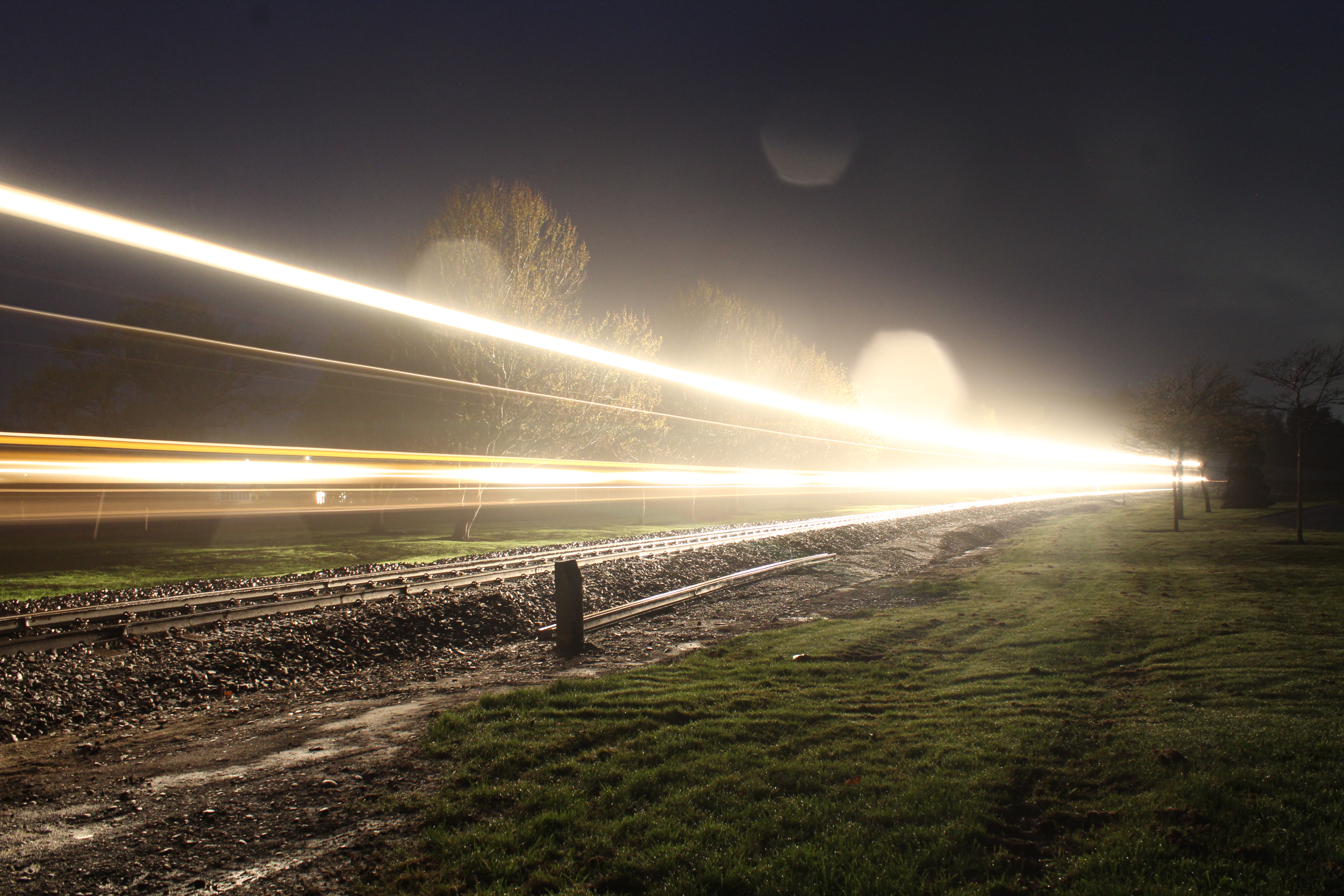
Freight train passing through Gore, New Zealand. The 'BULB' mode on a DSLR camera was used for this photo. Note the "flashing" of the locomotive ditch lights.

While there is no fixed definition of what constitutes "long", the intent is to create a photo that somehow shows the effect of passing time, be it smoother waters or light trails. A 30-minute photo of a static object and surrounding cannot be distinguished from a short exposure; hence, the inclusion of motion is the main factor to add intrigue to long exposure photos. Images with exposure times of several minutes also tend to make moving people or dark objects disappear (because they are in any one spot for only a fraction of the exposure time), often adding a serene and otherworldly appearance to long exposure photos.

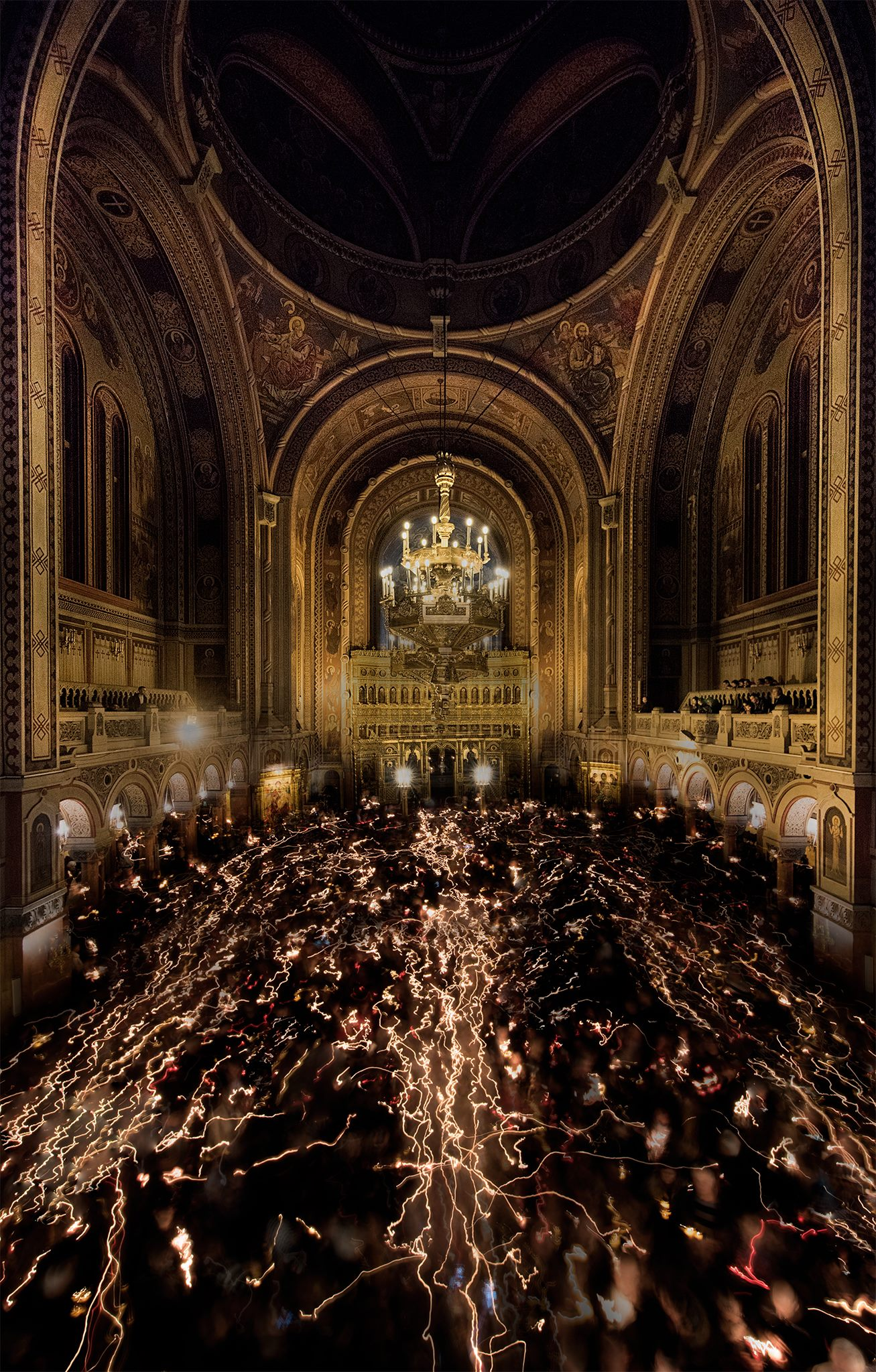
A 30-second exposure showing candlelight trails in a cathedral in Romania

When a scene includes both stationary and moving subjects (for example, a fixed street and moving cars or a camera within a car showing a fixed dashboard and moving scenery), a slow shutter speed can cause interesting effects, such as light trails.

Long exposures are easiest to accomplish in low-light conditions but can be done in brighter light using neutral density filters or specially designed cameras. When using a dense neutral density filter, a camera's auto focus will not be able to function. It is best to compose and focus without the filter. Then once one is happy with the composition, they can switch to manual focus and put the neutral density filter back on.

== Applications ==
=== Star-trail photography ===
A star-trail photograph uses long exposure times to capture the apparent motion of stars in the night sky due to Earth's rotation. A star-trail photograph shows individual stars as streaks across the image, with longer exposures yielding longer arcs.

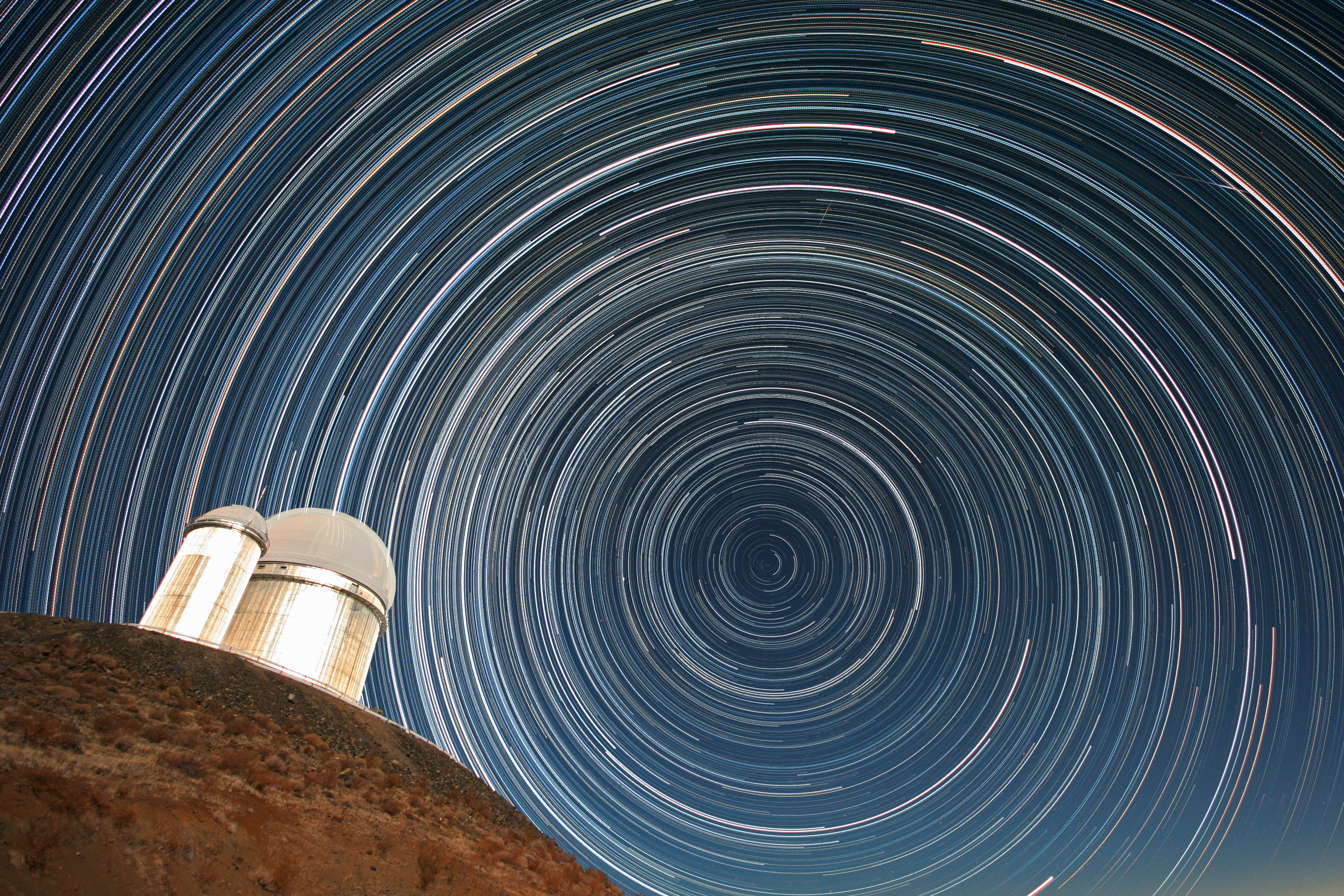
Star trails over the ESO 3.6 m Telescope

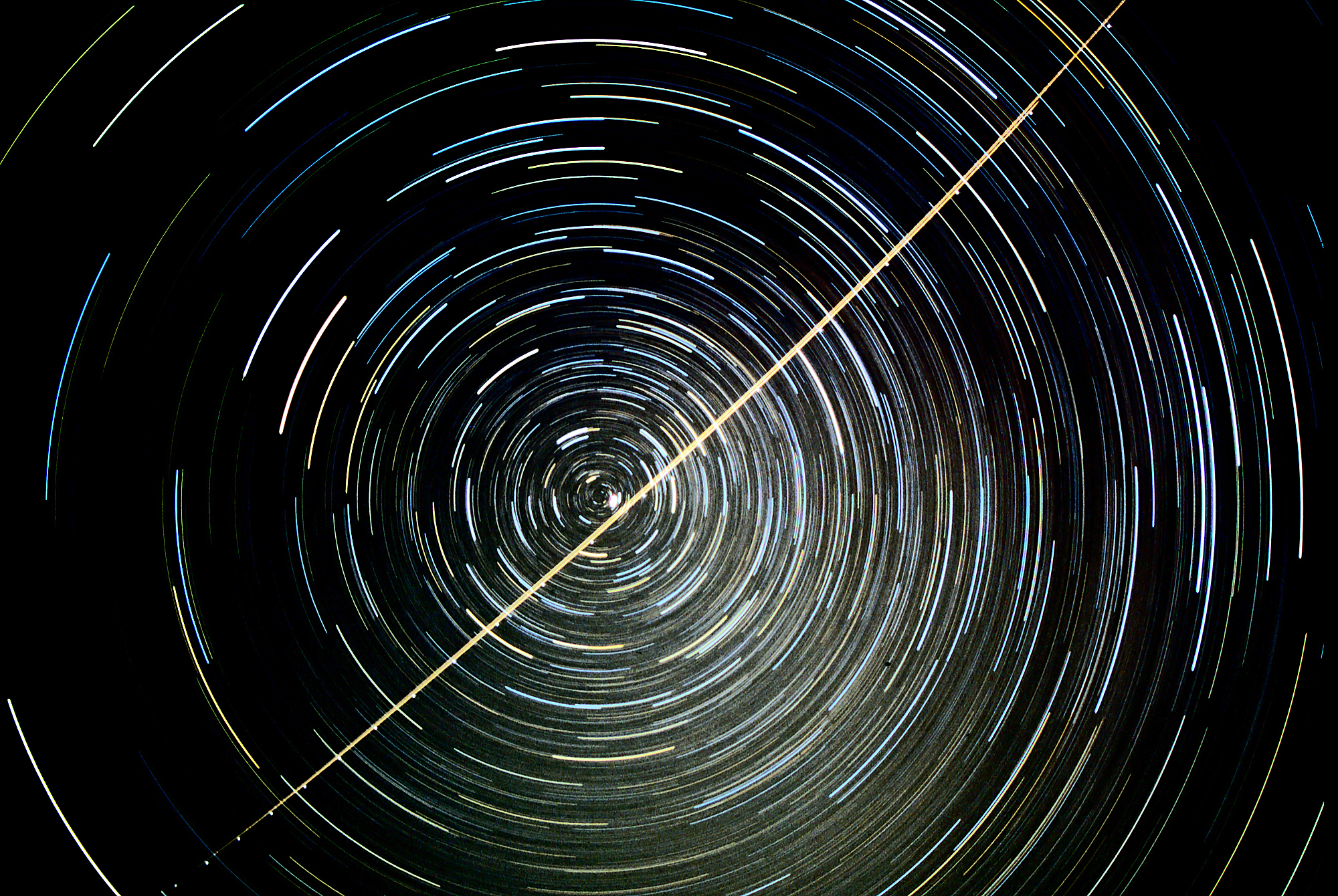
A star trail photograph showing the apparent motion of stars around the north celestial pole; Polaris is the bright star near the pole, just above the jet trail.

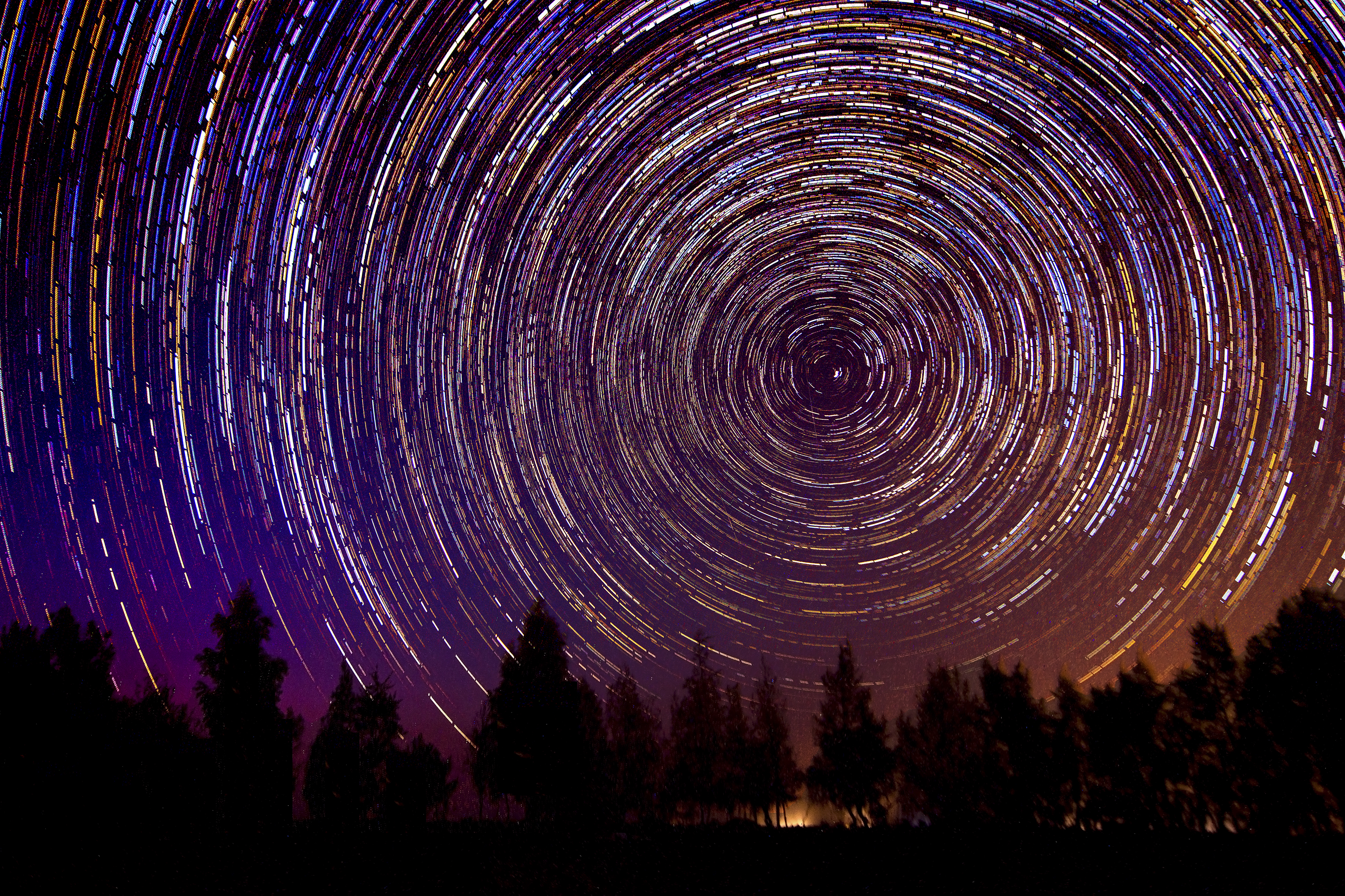
Startrail in Fayyoum, Egypt

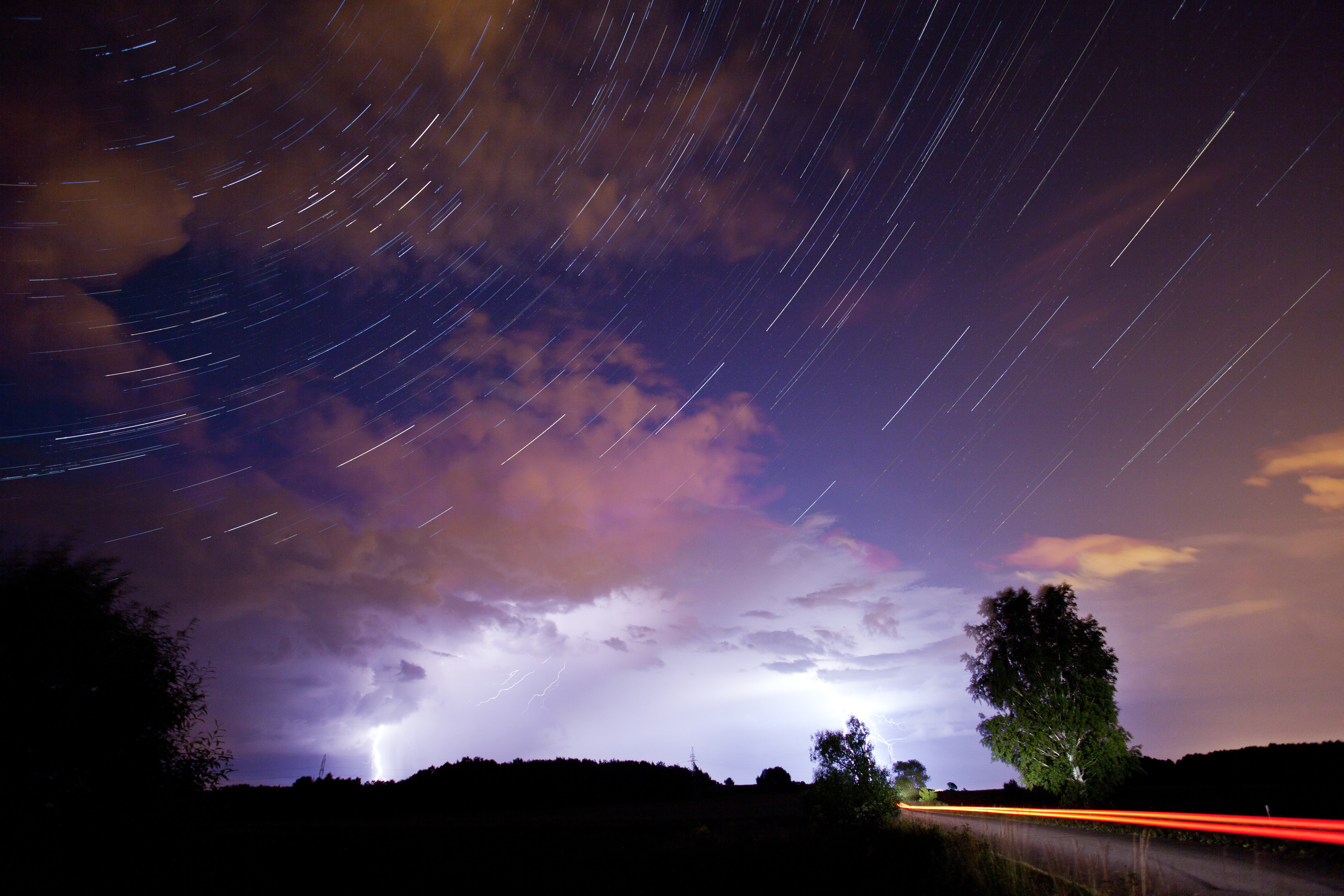
The constellation of Cassiopeia over a thunderstorm

=== Night photography ===
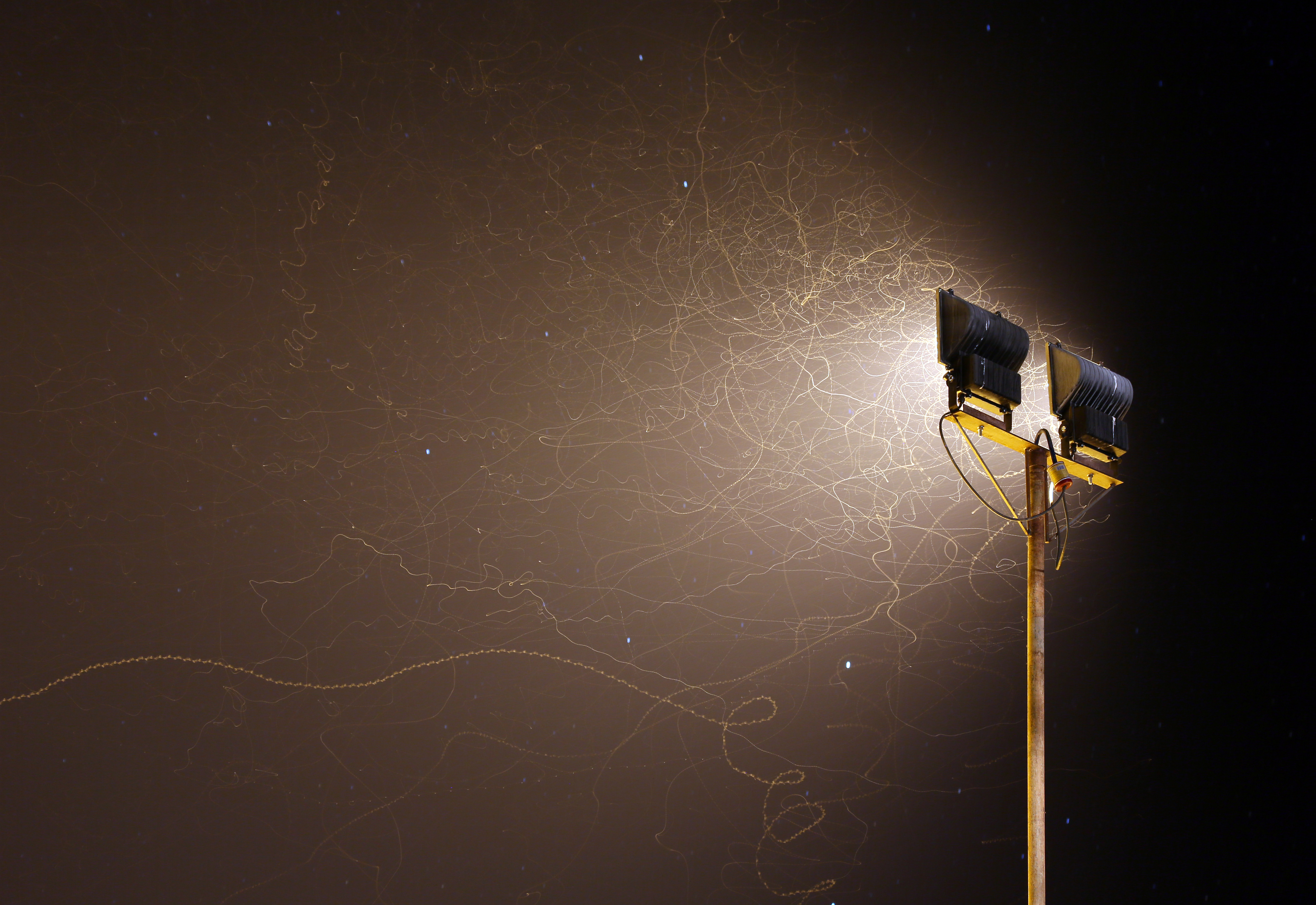
30-second long-exposure shot of nocturnal insects flying in front of a spotlight

Long-exposure photography is often used in a night-time setting, where the lack of light forces longer exposures, if maximum quality is to be retained. Increasing ISO sensitivity allows for shorter exposures, but substantially decreases image quality through reduced dynamic range and higher noise. By leaving the camera's shutter open for an extended period of time, more light is absorbed, creating an exposure that captures the entire dynamic range of the digital camera sensor or film. If the camera is stationary for the entire period of time that the shutter is open, a very vibrant and clear photograph can be produced.

=== Light painting ===
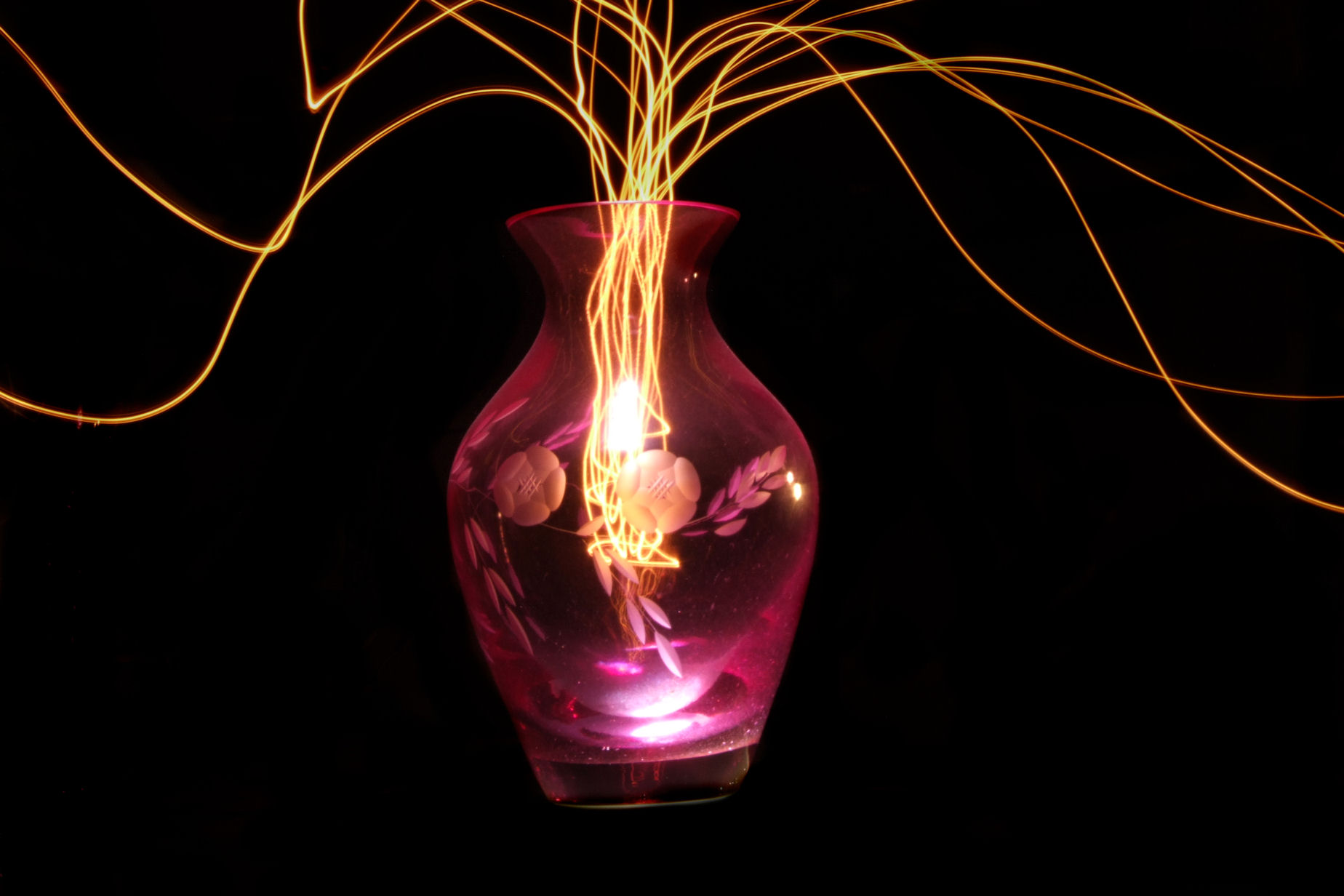
Example of light painting using long-exposure shot

In this technique, a scene is kept very dark and the photographer or an assistant takes a light source—it can be small penlight—and moves it about in patterns. The light source can be turned off between strokes. Often, stationary objects in the scene are illuminated by briefly turning on studio lights, by one or more flashes from a strobe light, or by increasing the aperture.

=== Water and long exposure ===
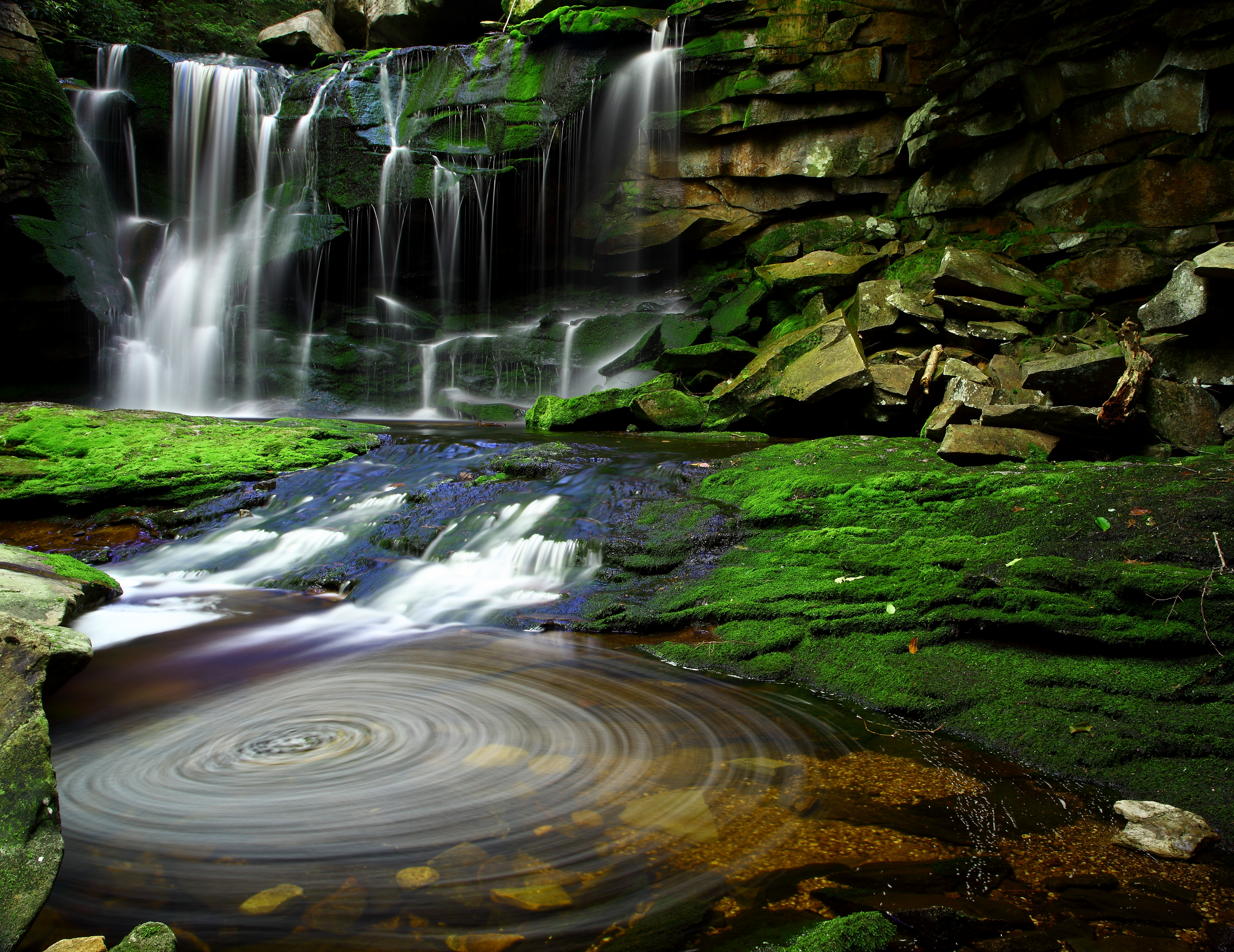
A 30-second-long exposure sharply captured the still elements of this image while blurring the waterfall into a mist-like appearance. Debris in the swirling water in the pool forms complete circles.

Long exposures can blur moving water so it has mist-like qualities while keeping stationary objects like land and structures sharp. Varying the shutter speed can produce different effects, preserving some of the water's turbulence or smoothing it out entirely.

== Solarigraphy ==
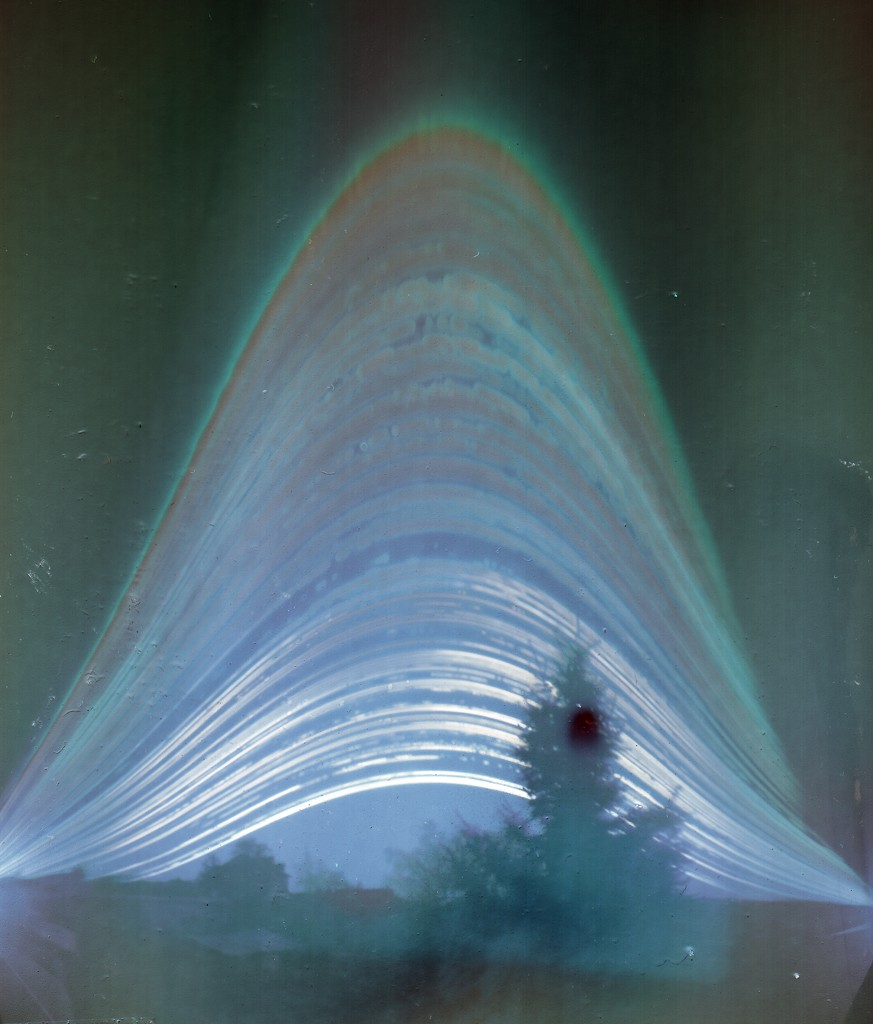
A one-year exposure showing sun trails for the entire year of 2014, taken from Sashegy in Budapest, Hungary

Solarigraphy (or solargraphy) is a technique in which a fixed pinhole camera is used to expose photographic paper for a length of time that is typically 6-months, but can be as short as a few hours and last well over a year. Depending on the length of the exposure the resulting image shows the path of the Sun across the sky both from dawn until dusk, but also from North to South (or vice versa) between the solstices. Each light streak in a solargraphic image represents one day. Where light streaks are broken or missing indicates obstruction of the sun, which is caused by cloud cover.

Frequently, cameras are made from upcycled aluminum or tin cans which can be made light-tight and are generally weatherproof for the time needed to make the exposure. Apertures usually range in fractions of a millimeter. An example is a single six-month exposure taken by photographer Justin Quinnell, showing sun-trails over Clifton Suspension Bridge between 19 December 2007 and 21 June 2008. Part of the Slow light: 6 months over Bristol exhibition, Quinnell describes the piece as capturing "a period of time beyond what we can perceive with our own vision." This method of solargraphy uses a simple pinhole camera securely fixed in a position which won't be disturbed. Quinnell's camera was made with an empty drink can and a sheet of photographic paper.

== See also ==
- Bulb (photography)
