= Excello =

Excello can refer to:

- Excello Records, a record label
- Excello, Missouri, a community in Missouri
- Excello, Ohio, a community in Ohio
- Ex-Cell-O Corporation, a defunct manufacturer of precision machine tools
- Mastermind Excello, the name of several superheroes
- The Excellos, the original name of the band The Zodiacs
