= Duncan Campbell (died 1758) =

British Army officer

Duncan Campbell was a Scots nobleman who died on 18 July 1758 as a result of wounds received in an unsuccessful frontal attack against French forces at Fort Carillon (renamed Fort Ticonderoga when the British took the fort a year later). The legend associated with Campbell is that a number of years prior—while still living in Scotland—Campbell gave shelter to a stranger who turned out to have killed Duncan's cousin. Faced with the conflict between betraying a guest or taking vengeance for the death of his cousin, Campbell compromised by allowing the killer to hide out in a cave. The ghost of Campbell's cousin is claimed to have appeared to Campbell in a dream and promised to meet him again at Ticonderoga, a place that Duncan surely had never heard of previously. This story was published in the poem "Ticonderoga a Legend of the West Highlands" by Robert Louis Stevenson in Scribner's Magazine December 1887.

Campbell's 42nd Regiment of Foot Highlanders took many casualties in the ill-fated attack on Fort Carillon. Legend has it that the battle was replicated in the clouds over Inveraray Castle in Scotland on the afternoon of the attack. The story of the ghostly prediction and the apparition in the clouds over Inverawe has been repeated a number of times in magazines, song, and used several times in television scripts. His remains are interred at the Union Cemetery in Fort Edward, NY alongside Jane McCrea and her cousin Sara McNeil.

== Songs ==
Inspired by the history and legend, Rich Nardin wrote (circa 1980) the song "Piper's Refrain", about the end of Campbell's story. The song was first released on Nardin's 1983 album, and has been recorded by multiple artists since. The song is in the folk tradition and may be thought by some to be a traditional ballad when sung by others. The story further inspired Margaret MacArthur to write "The Legend of Duncan Campbell" as an accompanying song which explores the beginning of the tale in Scotland.

- "Piper's Refrain (Duncan Campbell)". (1983) by Rich Nardin at Mudcat Café
- "The Legend of Duncan Campbell". (1989) by Margaret MacArthur at Mudcat Café
