= Bryant Grinder =

Bryant is a brand of machine tools headquartered in Springfield, Vermont. Acquired by Fives in 2015, the Bryant product line specializes in the grinding field, building grinding machines with computer numerical control (CNC).

Bryant began as an independent machine tool builder. The Bryant Chucking Grinder Company was founded in Springfield, Vermont in 1909 and was an independent company for its first half century, during which time it was widely known in the machining industries by the colloquial name Bryant Grinder. In 1958, it was bought by Ex-Cell-O Corporation, another machine tool builder, and became a subsidiary. In 1986, Ex-Cell-O and its subsidiaries, including Bryant, were purchased by Textron. In 1988, Textron sold Bryant Grinder to the Goldman Group, a financial investment group. In 2002, Bryant was purchased by Vermont Machine Tool, where it was operated as a division. In 2015, Bryant was purchased by Fives, an international engineering group, expanding its expertise to the design and manufacture of high-precision/high-production inner-outer diameter grinders.

== Early decades (1910s-1930s) ==
The Bryant Chucking Grinder Company was founded in 1909 by William LeRoy (Roy) Bryant, one of the machine tool entrepreneurs mentored by James Hartness of the Jones & Lamson Machine Company (J&L). Roy Bryant had joined J&L in 1897, became chief draughtsman in 1899, and was chief engineer by 1905. While working on tooling for chucking lathes, he invented a multispindle grinder for second-operation work, which he patented (U.S. patent 925,867). He took Hartness's advice and formed a company to build his grinders, and the Bryant Chucking Grinder Company joined J&L as one of several firms that made Springfield, Vermont an important center for machine tools and their tooling, such as accessories and cutting tools. (Others were the Fellows Gear Shaper Company and the Lovejoy Tool Company). Hartness helped finance the Bryant venture and was the firm's first president; Roy Bryant afterward assumed the post.

According to Vermont Machine Tool, "By 1910, a 20,000 sq ft building was built on the current location across the street from J&L. During the same year, 9 machines were shipped to Ford and Cadillac." The Bryant Company established itself as a noted brand for both internal and external grinding, and (like J&L) it became an important machine tool builder to the automotive industry.

World War I fueled great demand for machine tool builders such as J&L and Bryant. By 1917, the plant had doubled in size and was running 3 shifts a day. Vermont Machine Tool says, "Additional space was rented from J&L to help produce artillery shells. The war promotion created two new machine models especially for the aircraft industry." During World War I, the Ford Aircraft Division kept 102 Bryant machines busy in its production of the Liberty engine, and Bryant earned such a reputation for accuracy and precision that most of the grinding done on aircraft engines from World War I through the Interwar Period and World War II was performed on Bryant machines. Vermont Machine Tool says, "Firmly established in the automotive and aircraft sectors, Bryant began producing machines for the bearing industry."

Roy Bryant, a member of ASME and SAE, remained the firm's president and general manager until his death in 1931. He was succeeded in the presidency by E.J. Fullam, then Treasurer of the Fellows Company.

The Great Depression brought desperation to machine tool builders, many of which closed down. The strength of the product lines of some companies, including J&L and Bryant Grinder, allowed them to survive, generally because they were on the forefront of productivity, accuracy and precision, or both. Such firms' survival was helped by exports. For example, the Soviet Union was a large and important customer for many American industrial firms (including Ford and machine tool builders such as J&L and Bryant Grinder) in the 1920s and 1930s.

According to Vermont Machine Tool, Bryant used the downtime created by the Depression to focus on improvements to its machine designs. In various cases, manually controlled machines were made into semiautomatic, hydraulic power replaced pneumatic, and automatic sizing became available as an option. Also during this decade, motorized spindles (rotary axes with their own motors instead of being served power by gear trains or belts) were incorporated.

== World War II ==
Vermont Machine Tool says, "With World War II on the horizon, business was building rapidly. By 1938, sales had tripled and by 1940, the United States Army Ordnance Department requested that Bryant expand the building to 127,000 square feet. By 1942, the workforce grew to 1350 people with 200 of them being women." Like dozens of other companies during World War II, Bryant had a product line that was in such high demand that additional production had to be licensed to another firm. However, production volume of grinders caught up in time for Bryant itself to take on licensed production for other companies. For example, Bryant built some radar units for Raytheon and General Electric.

In 1946, Joseph B. Johnson, a longtime Bryant employee (and later a Governor of Vermont), became vice president and general manager.

Lend-Lease during World War II was in some respects the peak of export activity, but export would remain central ever after.

== Recent History ==
=== 1950s and 1960s ===
Business volume surged again with the Korean War. In the mid-1950s, Bryant's expertise in spindles led it to get involved in the computer drum memory business, in which it was successful. In 1958, Ex-Cell-O, based in Detroit, Michigan, purchased Bryant. Vermont Machine Tool says, "The Computer Products Division grew very rapidly and was eventually moved to Walled Lake, MI and rolled into another Ex-Cell-O division."

With the advent of the Cold War, U.S. trade with the U.S.S.R. was curtailed, although it did continue. But concerns about helping Soviet military strength tended to limit exports of some companies, especially those dealing with advanced machinery (as opposed to commodity goods). For example, Bryant was barred by the U.S. Commerce Department from fulfilling a large Soviet order for grinders in 1960–61. Bryant remained a strong exporter overall, though, with exports to many European and Asian countries. But continued trade with the Soviet Union would increasingly prompt contention. Bryant's trade with the Soviet Union is an example of what has been criticized by scholars including Antony C. Sutton as the moral dubiousness of corporations from democratic countries trading with those of nondemocratic countries, most especially in dual-use sectors of industry.

In 1959 Bryant started developing a computer disc-drive with 39 inch vertical platters, sold under the name Bryant Computer Products.

=== 1970s and 1980s ===
Bryant acquired the precision external centerless grinder line from Van Norman Machine Tool Company in 1972. Bryant's Soviet contracts continued to be controversial that same year. Bryant's sale of 45 precision grinders enabled the USSR to improve missile accuracy and MIRV their ICBMs. Objections to the sale were quashed by Henry Kissinger.

Vermont Machine Tool says of the Lectraline LL3 model, "The LL3 was the first CNC multi-surface grinding machine in the world. It was later introduced and demonstrated at the International Manufacturing Technology Show in 1980. The LL1, LL2 and LL4 size machines were soon to follow, giving Bryant the capacity of grinding internal diameters from .040" ID's to 88" OD's." In 1986, Ex-Cell-O and its subsidiaries, including Bryant, were purchased by Textron. In 1988, Textron sold Bryant Grinder to a financial investment group, the Goldman Group.

=== 1990s to 2014 ===
According to Vermont Machine Tool, the Goldman Group had "limited experience in the machine tool industry, which resulted in some difficult times for the company [and its] customers and suppliers. During February of 2002, Bryant Grinder suddenly closed […], prompting many to speculate that the company would never do business again."

In July 2002, Vermont Machine Tool bought Bryant Grinder. In the ensuing decade it operated Bryant with a continuing presence in the CNC grinding market.

=== 2015 to present ===
In 2015, Fives acquired Bryant's technology and intellectual property. The Bryant Grinder range of technologies and services will be legally operated out and developed by the resources (sales – engineering – assembly – field service) of Fives Landis Corp. Hagerstown, MD, USA company of Fives.

== Bibliography ==
- Broehl, Wayne G. Jr. (1959), Precision Valley: The Machine Tool Companies of Springfield, Vermont, Englewood Cliffs, New Jersey, USA: Prentice Hall, LCCN 59007360.
- Flanders, Ralph E. (1961), Senator from Vermont, Boston: Little, Brown.
- Roe, Joseph Wickham (1937), James Hartness: A Representative of the Machine Age at Its Best, New York: American Society of Mechanical Engineers, LCCN 37016470, OCLC 3456642. link from HathiTrust.
