= Baltimore Covered Bridge =

United States historic place

Coordinates: 43°16′13″N 72°26′54″W

The Baltimore Covered Bridge is a wooden covered bridge in Springfield, Vermont, United States.

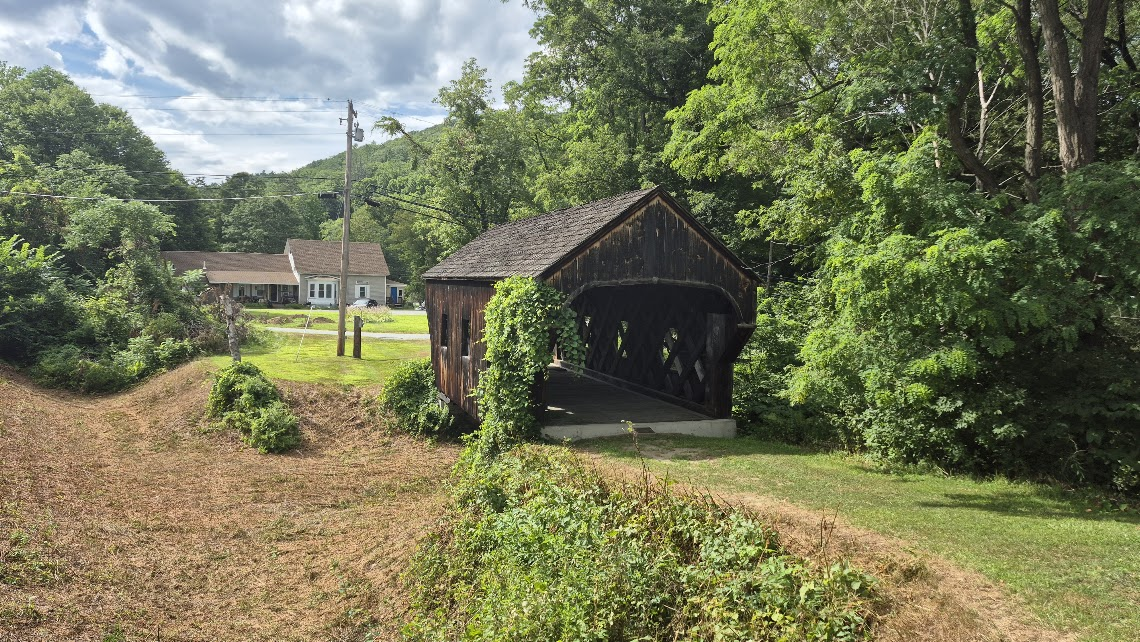
The bridge at its current location by the Eureka Schoolhouse.

== Description and history ==
The bridge was originally built in 1870 by Granville Leland and Dennis Allen over Great Brook in North Springfield, Vermont on the road leading to the small town of Baltimore, Vermont. It is a small bridge, only 44 feet long.

The Baltimore Covered Bridge was closed in 1967 due to its poor condition. Former U.S. Senator Ralph E. Flanders headed the committee to restore the bridge. It was restored under the direction of Milton S. Graton, a covered-bridge builder, and moved from North Springfield to a site next to the Eureka Schoolhouse in 1970. The restored Baltimore Covered Bridge was rededicated in the memory of Senator Flanders and Milton Graton.

== See also ==
- List of Vermont covered bridges
