= Daniel Folger Bigelow =

American painter

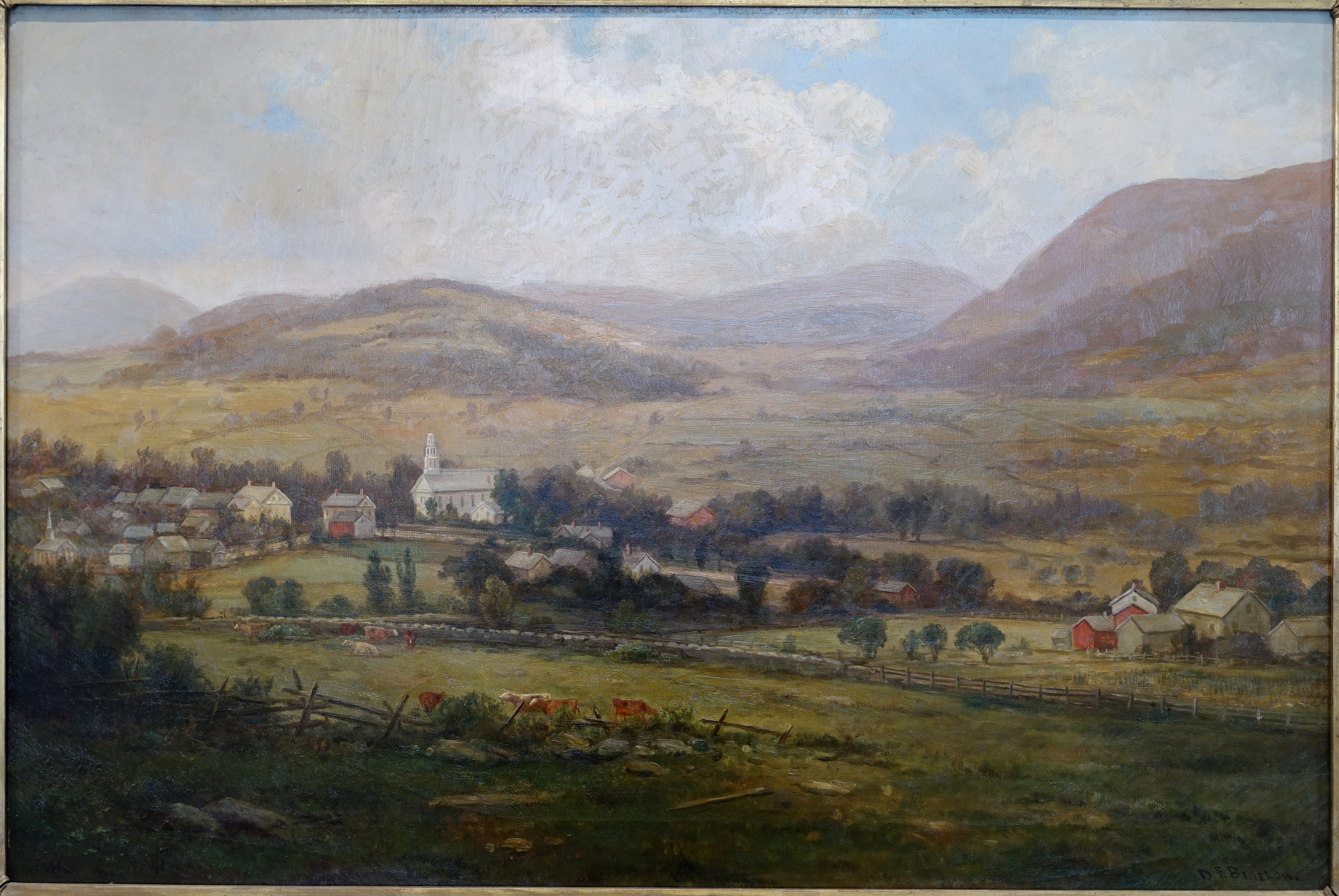
View of Old Bennington, Vermont, by Daniel Folger Bigelow, c. 1870

Daniel Folger Bigelow (July 22, 1823 - July 14, 1910) was an American painter active in New England and Chicago.

== History ==
Bigelow was born on a farm in Peru, New York and began painting at an early age. An early influence was Asahel Lynde Powers, who taught him "the delicacy of colors". At age 20, Bigelow moved to New York City and first saw the work of professional painters and decided to become a professional himself. In 1858, Bigelow moved to Chicago where he established a studio in Crosby's Opera House, subsequently destroyed in the great Chicago fire of 1871. Circa 1887 he was invited to become a charter member of the Academy of Design, later the Art Institute of Chicago. Bigelow exhibited in many galleries, as well as at the National Academy of Design, World's Columbian Exposition, and Philadelphia's Centennial Exposition of 1876.

He died in his sleep in Chicago in 1910.
