= Hartness House =

Historic house in Vermont, United States

- U.S. National Register of Historic Places
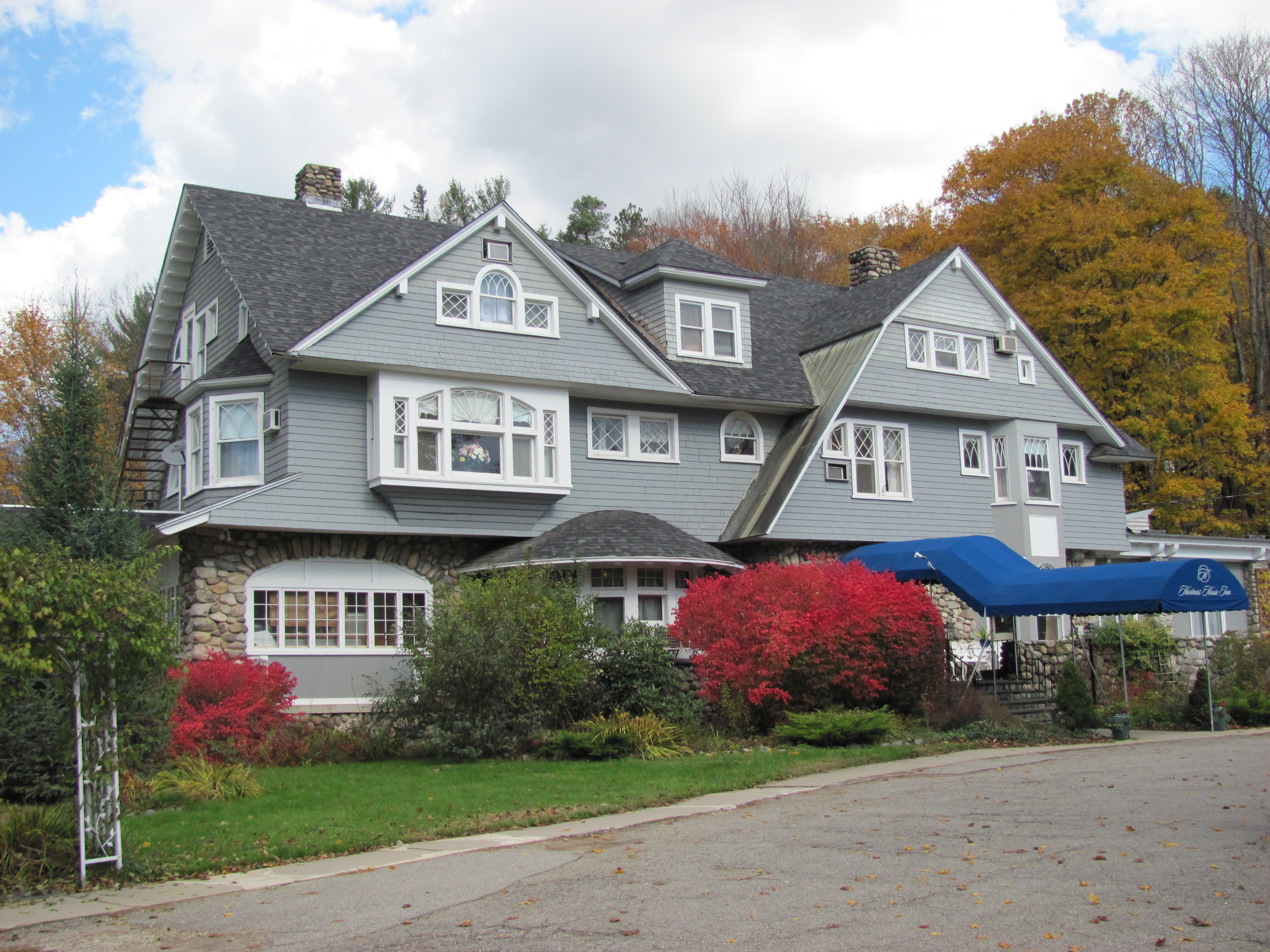

- Location within Vermont
- Location: 30 Orchard St., Springfield, Vermont
- Coordinates: 43°18′5″N 72°28′39″W
- Area: 5 acres (2.0 ha)
- Built: 1904
- Architectural style: Shingle Style
- NRHP reference No.: 78000254
- Added to NRHP: December 20, 1978

The Hartness House is a historic house at 30 Orchard Street in Springfield, Vermont. Built in 1904, it is one Vermont's relatively small number of high-style Shingle style houses. It was built for James Hartness, owner of a local machine factory and later Governor of Vermont. The house, now a small hotel, was listed on the National Register of Historic Places in 1978.

== Description and history ==
The Hartness House is located on the northeastern outskirts of central Springfield, at the northern end of Orchard Street. The original main portion of the house is a T-shaped 2 1/2-story gable-roofed wood-frame structure, its main facade facing to the south. The facade is busy with a variety of projections and cross gables of various sizes, with its ground floor exterior finished in fieldstone, and the upper levels clad in wooden shingles. Windows come in a variety of sizes and styles, many of them featuring diamond lights and other forms of tracery. The front-facing gables have decorative blocks at the peak and midway down the side, while the end gables have exposed rafter ends. A series of additions and ells have been added, primarily to the rear, providing additional facilities for its current hotel functions.

The house was built in 1904 for James Hartness, then the president of the Jones and Lamson Machine Company, a prominent local manufacturer. Hartness was then at the height of his business success, which was later crowned by his election as Governor of Vermont in 1921–22. Hartness was one of the nation's first licensed aircraft pilots, and hosted his friend and aviator Charles Lindbergh in this house.

== See also ==
- National Register of Historic Places listings in Windsor County, Vermont
