= North Springfield, Vermont =

Census-designated place in Vermont, United States

- Census-designated place
- Location in Windsor County and the state of Vermont.
- Coordinates: 43°19′50″N 72°31′40″W
- Country: United States
- State: Vermont
- County: Windsor

Area
  - Total: 1.1 sq mi (2.9 km^{2})
  - Land: 1.1 sq mi (2.9 km^{2})
  - Water: 0.039 sq mi (0.1 km^{2})
- Elevation: 545 ft (166 m)

Population (2010)
  - Total: 573
  - Density: 510/sq mi (200/km^{2})
- Time zone: UTC-5 (Eastern (EST))
  - Summer (DST): UTC-4 (EDT)
- ZIP Codes: 05150 (North Springfield); 05156 (Springfield)
- Area code: 802
- FIPS code: 50-51925
- GNIS feature ID: 2586645

North Springfield is an unincorporated community and census-designated place in the town of Springfield, Windsor County, Vermont, United States. As of the 2020 census, North Springfield had a population of 694. It lies at an altitude of 495 feet (151 m). A post office has been operated in North Springfield since 1832. Black River Produce, a major food processor and distributor, is headquartered in the village.

It is the location of the Stellafane Observatory, which is a National Historic Landmark.
