= River Valley Technical Center =

Coordinates: 43°16′50″N 72°28′40″W

Location
- 307 South Street; Springfield, Vermont; United States

Information
- Type: Public secondary
- Grades: 9–12
- Director: Scott D. Farr
- Assistant Director: Derek Williams
- Website: rvtc.org

River Valley Technical Center is a career and technical school in Springfield, Vermont. Students learn technical skills in their program areas and employability skills. Academic skills including mathematics, reading and writing, science and social studies are taught as part of the program area curriculum.

The center enrolls students from Bellows Falls Union High School, Black River High School, Compass School, Green Mountain Union High School, Fall Mountain Regional High School and Springfield High School. It also enrolls homeschooled students, recent high school graduates and students from private schools.

Until the 2007–08 school year, the center was under the jurisdiction of the Springfield School District, until all towns which send students to the center voted to separate from the Springfield School District and fall under the purview of a newly created district.

The River Valley Tech Center also runs a local robotics and aerial drones club called "The River Valley Rads".
