= Greenlee =

American tool company

- Type: Subsidiary
- Founded: 1862; 164 years ago
- Founders: Robert Lemuel Greenlee; Ralph Stebbins Greenlee
- Headquarters: Rockford, Illinois, United States
- Products: Tools
- Parent: Emerson Electric Co.
- Website: www.greenlee.com

Greenlee is an American industrial and electrical tool company headquartered in Rockford, Illinois. It was founded in 1862 by twin brothers Robert L. and Ralph S. Greenlee to manufacture their invention called a hollow chisel mortiser, consisting of a drill surrounded by four chisel blades used in making mortises (the hole) for mortise and tenon joints, for the furniture industry in Rockford. While no longer produced by Greenlee, hollow chisel mortisers are still used in cabinetmaking today from a variety of other manufacturer. The brothers later diversified into a variety of hand woodworking tools as well as machinery for making wooden barrels.

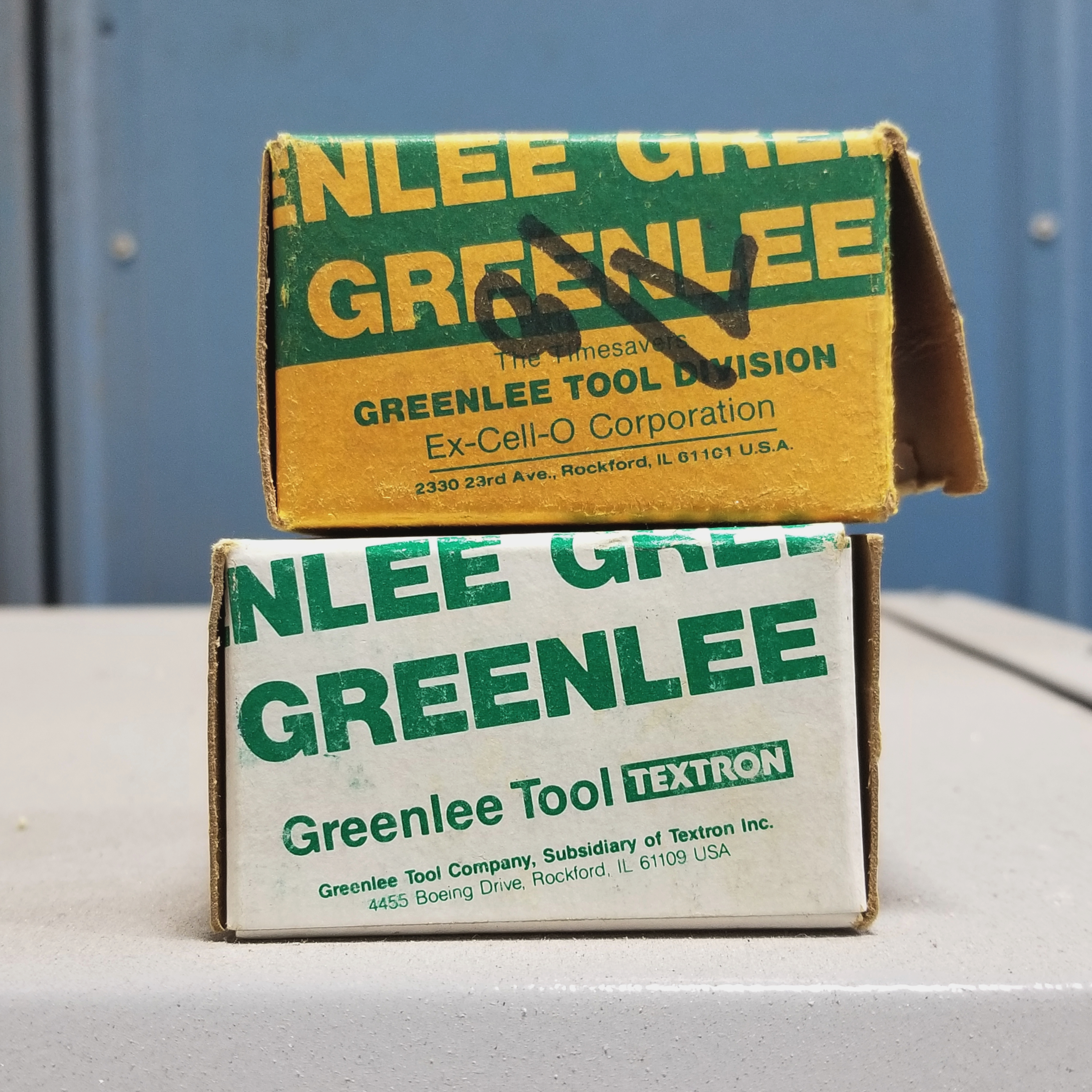
Boxes showing Greenlee package design during ownership by Ex-Cell-O Corporation and later Textron

The company was acquired by Detroit-based Ex-Cell-O Corporation in 1969. Industrial conglomerate Textron acquired Greenlee as part of its acquisition of Ex-Cell-O and its subsidiaries in 1986. Greenlee purchased Fairmont Hydraulics in 1992 and German tool manufacturer Klauke in 1996. Greenlee expanded into data/telecommunications equipment with the acquisition of several companies in 1999 and 2000 which now fall under the Greenlee Communications brand. Greenlee expanded its DIY offering with the addition of Paladin Tools on December 17, 2007. In 2008, Greenlee acquired Utilux. In 2013, Sherman + Reilly, and HD Electric joined the Greenlee family of Utility brands. The Greenlee brothers were inspired into industrial work by their father who was a cooper. Their contributions to the railroad industry included an automatic tie and track laying and drilling machine that rolled right along behind on the track it had just laid.

On April 18, 2018, Textron announced that it planned to sell its Greenlee brand to Emerson Electric Co. within 90 days. Greenlee is listed as a subsidiary and/or affiliate of Emerson as of September 30, 2019.

== Products ==
- Cable Pulling & Fishing - cable pullers, wire fishing
- Knockouts - Knockout sets, punches, dies, drivers
- Power Tool Accessories - step bits, auger bits, drill & taps
- Bending - electric conduit benders, hydraulic benders & pumps, mechanical benders
- Wire and cable termination - Cable crimpers & cutters
- Testing and measurement - Low & high voltage test and measurement tools
- Storage and material handling - storage boxes, wire carts, stands
- Utility hydraulic tools - pumps, breakers, impact wrenches
- General purpose & Safety Tools - professional hand tool kits, manual bolt cutters, insulated hand tools
