= Eureka Schoolhouse =

- U.S. National Register of Historic Places
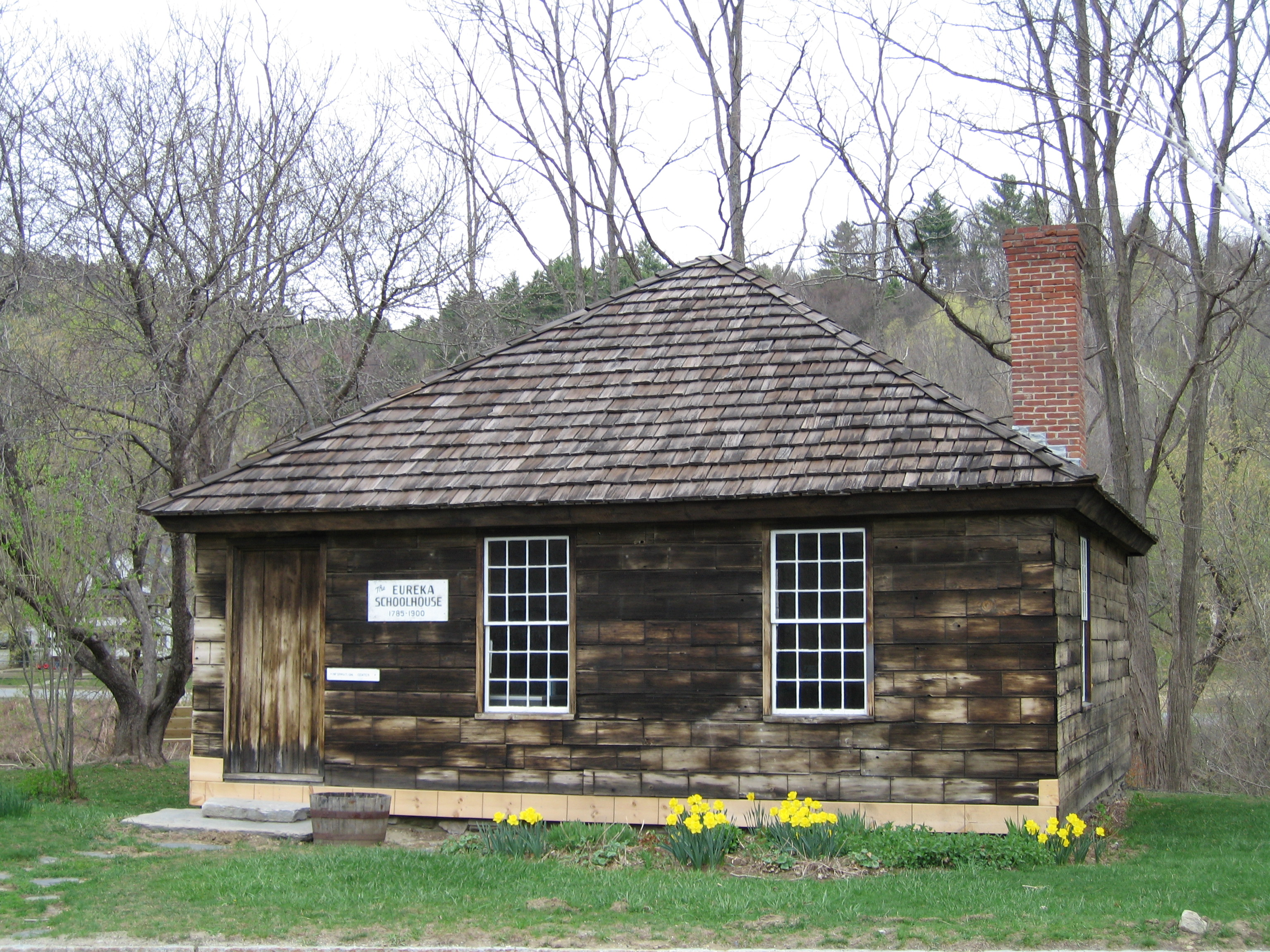

- Location within Vermont Location within the United States
- Location: 470 Charlestown Rd., Goulds Mill (Springfield), Vermont
- Coordinates: 43°16′13″N 72°26′52″W
- Area: 1 acre (0.40 ha)
- Built: 1785
- NRHP reference No.: 71000074
- Added to NRHP: March 11, 1971

The Eureka Schoolhouse is a historic school building at 470 Charlestown Road (Vermont Route 11) in the Goulds Mill village of Springfield, Vermont. Built in 1785, it is the oldest surviving schoolhouse in the state. It is the centerpiece of a small historic site operated by the state. The school was listed on the National Register of Historic Places in 1971.

== Description and history ==
The Eureka Schoolhouse stands between Vermont Route 11 (to the south) and the Black River to the north, in the dispersed rural setting of Goulds Mill, southeast of the Springfield's main village center. It is a small single-story structure, built out of hand-hewn timbers and covered by a wooden shingle roof. Its walls are finished in rough-cut wooden boards, scored to resemble cut stone. A brick chimney rises from the rear right corner. The front facade, facing south toward the road, is three bays wide, with the entrance in the left bay, and large sash windows in the other two.

The school is believed to have been built in 1785, and is the oldest known schoolhouse in the state. It underwent a series of alterations over the 19th century, and was closed in 1900. It stood vacant and abandoned for many years, and was carefully disassembled by preservationists and stored in 1958. In 1968, it was reassembled to its original configuration (as best it could be determined from extant records) at the present site, which also includes the relocated Baltimore Covered Bridge.

== See also ==
- National Register of Historic Places listings in Windsor County, Vermont
- List of Vermont State Historic Sites
