= Van Norman Machine Tool Company =

American machine tool builder

Van Norman #12 milling machine

The Van Norman Machine Tool Company was an American machine tool builder from late in the 19th century until the mid-1980s. The company was based in Springfield, Massachusetts, USA. Its main areas of focus were milling machines and grinding machines. The company was acquired by Universal American Corporation during the early 1960s. Universal American later merged with Gulf and Western Industries.

== Early history ==
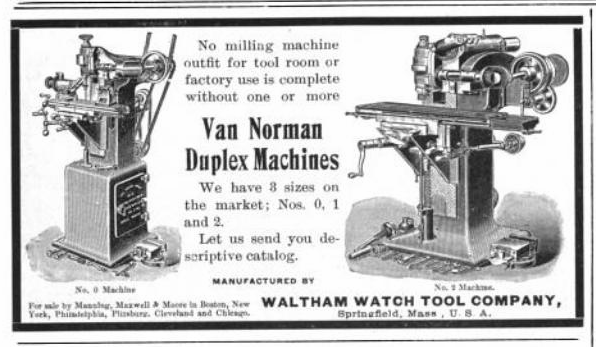
An advertisement from 1902.

A pair of brothers surnamed Van Norman were the founders of the company. Their names were Charles E. and Fred D. Van Norman. The Van Normans began their company as the Hopkins Watch Tool Company in Waltham, Massachusetts around 1874. Their first products were watch repair lathes and associated tooling. In 1883, they bought the name Waltham Watch Tool Company, as that company started watch production under the name of U.S. Watch Co. It was at that time that the move was made to Springfield.

In 1890 the first Van Norman Milling Machine was built, and in 1914 the first of Van Norman's oscillating grinding machines was introduced. Oscillating grinders were sold to many of the world's leading manufacturers of ball and roller bearings.

== Ram type mills ==
Van Norman was most noted for their "ram type" milling machines, which due to their swiveling head design could be converted quickly and easily from horizontal to vertical spindles. The ram type mills were produced for many years and in a wide range of sizes, from the home-shop-sized No. 6 up to the 9,000 pound No. 38. The company also produced heavy horizontal milling machines, as well as a small vertical milling machine for tool and die work.

#12 with head in horizontal position

#12 with head in vertical position

== Other tools ==
In addition to milling machines, Van Norman pursued several other machining-related lines of business.

Automotive repair

Van Norman pioneered a portable boring bar that could be used to bore the cylinders of automobile engines without removing the engine from the automobile. They also manufactured other automotive service machinery, such as brake lathes and crankshaft grinders.

When Van Norman ceased to exist as an independent company, the automotive portion was purchased by Kwik-Way, who still sell tools and machinery using the Van Norman name.

Machine tools for grinding

Van Norman's line of grinding machines became very important in the bearing industry. Oscillating grinders were sold to many of the world's leading manufacturers of ball and roller bearings. Van Norman sold its precision external centerless grinder line to Bryant in 1972.

The Van Norman rotary surface grinders, primarily used to resurface engine flywheels, are currently manufactured by Irontite Products Inc. as of 2014, located in Cedar Rapids, Iowa. Irontite Products Inc. also purchased the rights to the Van Norman Brake Lathe line. They later stopped production of all brake lathes due to a dwindling market for resurfacing brake rotors and drums.

== Spindle tooling ==
In keeping with many manufacturers of the era, some Van Norman machines use a proprietary spindle taper. The No. 6, No. 12, and some of the No. 16 ram type mills use what Van Norman referred to as their "C" taper (Hardinge refers to this taper as 5V today). This taper was also used in some of Van Norman's smaller dividing heads and auxiliary milling subheads. Some of the larger machines use Van Norman's "No. 2" taper (Hardinge 50V), and some of the larger dividing heads and milling subheads use this taper as well. Larger machines used an assortment of tapers—earlier mills will most likely have either some size of Brown & Sharpe taper or Van Norman's "No. 2" taper. Later mills usually have NMTB milling machine tapers (30, 40, or 50, depending on machine size). It is probable that any machine could be ordered new with any taper the buyer desired.

== Bibliography ==
- Kasunich, John M. (2002), Van Norman Machine Tool Company History.
- National Association of Watch and Clock Collectors (2009), "[Information on Van Norman, collated from contemporary Waltham City Directories.]", NAWCC Bulletin, 51 (382), NAWCC: 540.
