= James Bates Thomson =

American mathematician

James Bates Thomson (May 21, 1808 – June 22, 1883) was an American mathematician, educator, and writer.

Thomson was born in Springfield, Vermont, on May 21, 1808. He was the son of John and Elizabeth (Brown) Thomson. After several years' experience in teaching, he entered Yale College in 1829, but on completing his freshman year he was obliged to be absent on account of illness, and so did not graduate until 1834.

After taking his degree he spent one year in New Haven, Connecticut, as a resident graduate, and then took charge of an academy in Nantucket, Massachusetts, where he remained until 1842, when he resigned and moved to Auburn, New York. He was then entrusted by Yale president Jeremiah Day with the duty of abridging his treatise on algebra, and for four or five years subsequently devoted himself to the organization and extension of teachers' institutes and similar gatherings. He moved to New York City in 1846. For the rest of his life he lived at various times in New York City and also in Brooklyn, New York, which was then a separate city. He continued to work on the completion and revision of a series of mathematical works. He received the degree of Doctor of Laws from Hamilton College in 1853, and again from the University of Tennessee in 1882. He moved to Brooklyn in 1868, and for eight years before he died suffered from rheumatism. He died in Brooklyn, June 22, 1883, at age 75.

He married, August 25, 1840, Mary Coffin, who survived him with their only child, a daughter. His great-grandson, Thomson Burtis, was a prolific writer of adventure stories for boys as well as several movie scripts.

This article incorporates public domain material from the 1884 Yale Obituary Record.
