= Louis G. Whitcomb =

American attorney and politician

United States Attorney for Vermont
- In office 1953–1961
- Appointed by: Dwight D. Eisenhower
- Preceded by: Joseph A. McNamara
- Succeeded by: Joseph F. Radigan

President of the Vermont Bar Association
- In office 1966–1967
- Preceded by: Christopher A. Webber
- Succeeded by: Hilton Wick

Judge of the Windsor, Vermont Municipal Court
- In office January 30, 1947 – January 31, 1949
- Preceded by: Walter Schinoski
- Succeeded by: Kenneth Robinson

Personal details
- Born: July 30, 1903 Springfield, Vermont
- Died: October 12, 1984 (aged 81) Springfield, Vermont
- Resting place: Summer Hill Cemetery, Springfield, Vermont
- Spouse(s): Catharine Kingdon (m. 1934-1946, divorced); Alice-Elizabeth Stiles (m. 1946-1984, his death)
- Children: 2
- Education: Suffolk University Law School
- Occupation: Attorney; Public official

Military service
- Allegiance: United States
- Branch/service: United States Navy
- Years of service: 1943–1945
- Rank: Lieutenant commander
- Unit: Naval Air Station Clinton, Oklahoma
- Battles/wars: World War II

Louis G. Whitcomb (July 30, 1903 - October 12, 1984) was an American attorney and political figure from Vermont. A Republican, he was most notable for his service as United States Attorney for the District of Vermont.

== Early life ==
Louis Gorman Whitcomb was born in Taunton, Massachusetts on July 30, 1903, a son of Louis A. Whitcomb and Mary E. (Gorman) Whitcomb. He was raised in Taunton until he was 14, when his family relocated to Springfield, Vermont. Whitcomb graduated from Springfield High School in 1921. He taught school before deciding on a legal career. In 1929, he received his LL.B. degree from Suffolk University Law School.

== Start of career ==
Whitcomb was admitted to the bar in 1929 and practiced in Springfield. In the 1920s and 1930s, Whitcomb and friend Everett Williams, the station manager of WNBX in Springfield, hosted a weekday morning radio show.

A Republican, Whitcomb served as a Springfield justice of the peace from 1923 to 1953. Whitcomb joined the United States Navy for World War II and served from 1943 to 1945. After completing his initial training at Naval Air Station Quonset Point, Rhode Island, Whitcomb was assigned to the staff of Naval Air Station Clinton, Oklahoma. He attained the rank of lieutenant commander, and after his discharge he resumed practicing law in Springfield.

From 1947 to 1948 he served as executive clerk to Governor Ernest W. Gibson Jr. In addition, he served as judge of Windsor's municipal court from 1947 to 1949.

== U.S. Attorney ==
The 1952 presidential election victory of Republican Dwight D. Eisenhower gave him the opportunity to appoint Republicans to federal posts including United States Attorney following 20 years of Democratic administrations led by Franklin D. Roosevelt and Harry S. Truman. In October 1953, Eisenhower nominated Whitcomb to succeed Joseph A. McNamara as U.S. Attorney for the District of Vermont; Whitcomb had been jointly recommended by Vermont's U.S. Senators, George Aiken and Ralph Flanders. Whitcomb continued to serve until 1961, when the newly-elected Democratic president, John F. Kennedy, nominated Democrat Joseph F. Radigan to succeed Whitcomb.

== Later career ==
After leaving office, Whitcomb resumed practicing law in Springfield. From 1966 to 1967 he served as president of the Vermont Bar Association. Whitcomb was a member of the Springfield Housing Authority, and a trustee of Springfield's town library. He was also a trustee of the Claremont Savings Bank (Claremont, New Hampshire), a member of Springfield's Elks lodge, and a member of Springfield's American Legion post.

== Death and burial ==
Whitcomb practiced law until retiring in 1981. In 1983, he suffered a stroke that made it difficult for him to move or speak. He died in Springfield on October 12, 1984. Whitcomb was buried at Summer Hill Cemetery in Springfield.

== Family ==
In 1934, Whitcomb married Catharine Kingdon (1909-1997) of Claremont, New Hampshire. They divorced following his return from military service and in 1946 Whitcomb married Alice-Elizabeth (Stiles) Hackett (1908-1998). With his first wife, Whitcomb was the father of Priscilla Herbert (1938-2009). With his second wife, Whitcomb was the father of daughter Susan Sbrega Foster.

== Sources ==
=== Newspapers ===
- "Louis G. Whitcomb Weds Catherine Kingdon". Rutland Daily Herald. Rutland, VT. November 20, 1934. p. 9 – via Newspapers.com.
- "L. G. Whitcomb, Springfield, in Naval Reserves". Rutland Daily Herald. Rutland, VT. March 6, 1943. p. 9 – via Newspapers.com.
- "Springfield: Lieut. Louis G. Whitcomb". Rutland Daily Herald. Rutland, VT. July 1, 1943. p. 11 – via Newspapers.com.
- "Springfield: Louis G. Whitcomb and Alice Elizabeth Hackett Were Married". Rutland Daily Herald. Rutland, VT. September 2, 1946. p. 15 – via Newspapers.com.
- "Radigan Sworn In to U.S. Post". Rutland Daily Herald. Rutland, VT. May 6, 1961. p. 1 – via Newspapers.com.
- "Governor Offers Congratulations". Bennington Banner. Bennington, VT. October 3, 1966. p. 1 – via Newspapers.com.
- "Sbrega-Whitcomb Wedding". Rutland Herald. Rutland, VT. August 3, 1980. p. 19 – via Newspapers.com.
- Smallheer, Susan (October 13, 1984). "Former U.S. Attorney Dead". Rutland Daily Herald. Rutland, VT. Southern Vermont Bureau. pp. 5–6 – via Newspapers.com.
- "Obituary, Catharine L. Kingdon LaCasse". Mansfield News Journal. Mansfield, OH. November 10, 1997. p. 8 – via Newspapers.com.
- "Obituary, Priscilla Hebert". Rutland Herald. Rutland, VT. July 22, 2009 – via Legacy.com.

=== Books ===
- Armstrong, Howard E. (1957). Vermont Legislative Directory and State Manual. Montpelier, VT: Vermont Secretary of State. p. 602 – via HathiTrust.

=== Magazines ===
- Thompson, Ellie (May 19, 1989). "WNBX Springfield, 1927-1940" (PDF). Voices from the Hills. South Royalton, VT: Vermont Association of Broadcasters. p. 7.
