= Ex-Cell-O =

Defunct manufacturer of precision machinery

Ex-Cell-O Corp.
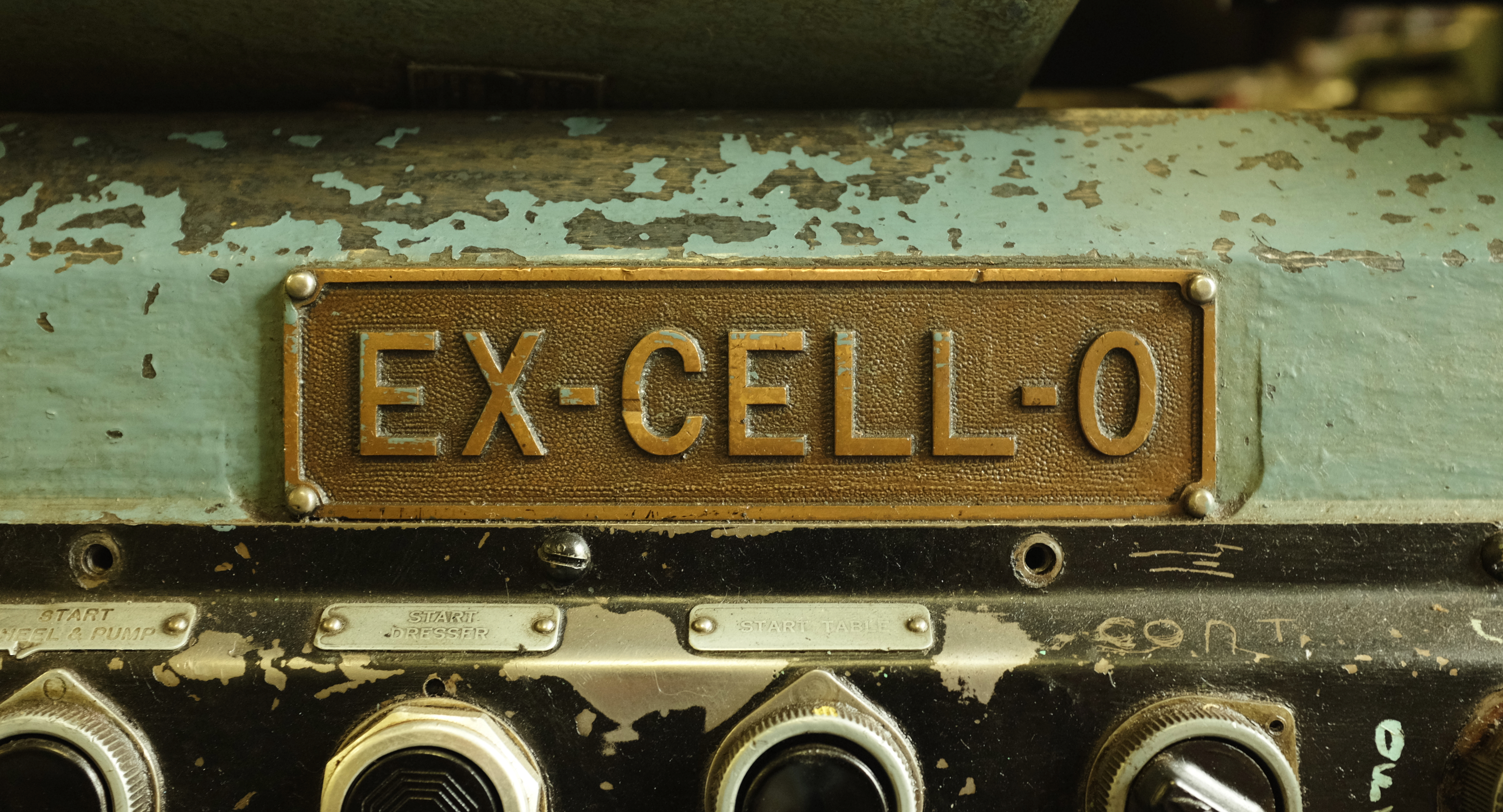
- Brass nameplate attached to an Ex-Cell-O Model 33 precision thread grinder.
- Industry: Precision machinery, industrial tools
- Founded: 1919 in Highland Park, Michigan
- Defunct: 2006
- Headquarters: Sterling Heights, Michigan
- Products: Thread grinding machines, boring machines, facing machines, lapping machines

Ex-Cell-O Corporation (commonly known as simply X-L-O) was an American manufacturer of machinery and machine tools located in suburban Detroit, Michigan, United States. The company was in operation from 1919 to 2006.

== History ==
=== United States ===
The company was established in 1919 as Ex-Cell-O Tool and Manufacturing Co. by a group of tool and die makers, all of whom were former employees of Ford Motor Company. The site of the original shop was located in Highland Park, Michigan. This location is a few blocks from the world's first automobile assembly line, at the Highland Park Ford Plant. Newton "Woody" Woodworth served as the first president and general manager.

In its early years, around sixty percent of the company's business was manufacturing parts and fixtures for aircraft. Due to its focus on the aviation industry, the company name was changed to Ex-Cell-O Aircraft and Tool Corporation in 1927. At this time, they also made grinding machines (including Carboloy-branded grinders that Carboloy, Inc. sold) and air-driven grinding spindles.

In 1937, Woodworth left the company, which was then reorganized as Ex-Cell-O Corp. The more general name was chosen to reflect their increasingly diverse product lines, which included high-precision thread grinders, boring machines, facing machines, and lapping machines.

Ex-Cell-O was part of the Arsenal of Democracy. During World War II, they manufactured the following products for military use:

- Nozzle plates for rockets
- Aircraft engine parts
- Boring machines
- Thread grinding machines
- Center lapping machines

By the mid-1960s, the company was based in Troy, Michigan.

In 1986, Ex-Cell-O was acquired by defense industry conglomerate Textron for $77.50 per share in cash, totaling about $1.1 billion (equivalent to $3.2 billion in 2025). Under the merger agreement, Ex-Cell-O became a wholly owned subsidiary of Textron.

Ex-Cell-O began laying off all employees on April 28, 2006.

=== Canada ===
Ex-Cell-O Corporation of Canada, Ltd. manufactured heavy machine tools such as ram-type milling machines. The business was located at 120 Weston Street in London, Ontario.

=== India ===
The Indian branch was founded on March 10th, 1958, as Messrs. Amerind Engineering Company of Bombay, later known as Ex-Cell-O India Ltd, with technical and equity support from the American branch. The company mainly manufactured propeller shafts, machine-tools, and steering gear assemblies at this time. In 1978, the company bought itself, becoming fully Indian-owned and independent from the American branch, changing its name to XLO India Limited.

== Acquisitions ==
The following partial list is a history of acquisitions by the Ex-Cell-O Corporation.

Year	Acquisition	Location	Product Lines
1948	Robbins Engineering Co.	Detroit, Michigan	Jet engine rotors and related components, machine tools including magnetic chucks, sine bars, and sine plates
Mid-1950s	Michigan Tool Company	Detroit, Michigan	Gear finishing machine tools
1958	Bryant Chucking Grinder Co.	Springfield, Vermont	Production grinding machines and hard disk drives (under the Bryant Computer Products division)
1963	Micromatic Hone Corp		Honing machines
1969	Greenlee Brothers & Co.	Rockford, Illinois	Woodworking machinery
1977	McCord Corp.		Automotive, industrial, and agricultural products

== Company name ==
The following list is a chronology of the various names used by Ex-Cell-O Corporation throughout its history.

Year	Name	Notes
1919–1927	Ex-Cell-O Tool & Manufacturing Co.	
1927–1937	Ex-Cell-O Aircraft & Tool Corp.	Name changed to reflect the company's emphasis on parts and fixtures for aircraft.
1937–1986	Ex-Cell-O Corp.	Name chosen to reflect product line diversification.
1986–2006	Ex-Cell-O Machine Tools, Inc.	Name of the machine tools division of Ex-Cell-O Corp following its acquisition by Textron.
