= Joseph F. Radigan =

American attorney and politician

United States Attorney for Vermont
- In office 1961–1969
- Appointed by: John F. Kennedy
- Preceded by: Louis G. Whitcomb
- Succeeded by: George W. F. Cook

Member of the Vermont House of Representatives from Rutland City
- In office 1957–1961
- Preceded by: George F. Jones
- Succeeded by: William J. Hogan

Personal details
- Born: November 15, 1905 Rutland City, Vermont
- Died: August 1, 1975 (aged 69) Rutland City, Vermont
- Resting place: Calvary Cemetery, Rutland City, Vermont
- Spouse: Florence Irene Sabourin (m. 1945-1975, his death)
- Education: Saint Michael's College (attended); University of Notre Dame (attended)
- Occupation: Attorney; Public official

Military service
- Allegiance: United States
- Branch/service: United States Army
- Years of service: 1941–1945
- Rank: Technical Sergeant
- Unit: 17th Field Artillery Regiment
- Battles/wars: World War II

Joseph F. Radigan (November 15, 1905 - August 1, 1975) was an American attorney and politician from Vermont. A Democrat, He is most notable for serving as United States Attorney for the District of Vermont from 1961 to 1969.

== Early life ==
Joseph Francis Radigan was born in Rutland City, Vermont on November 15, 1905, a son of William H. Radigan and Mary Catherine (Ryan) Radigan. He attended St. Peters Catholic School and graduated from Rutland High School in 1924. He attended Saint Michael's College in Winooski, Vermont and the University of Notre Dame before beginning a legal career in 1927 by studying law at the Ludlow law firm of William W. Stickney, John G. Sargent, Homer L. Skeels, and Olin M. Jeffords.

While living in Ludlow, Radigan was a member of the Vermont National Guard's Company B, 172nd Infantry Regiment. He received a commission as a second lieutenant of Infantry, and was later promoted to first lieutenant. Radigan had played center on the football teams at Rutland High School and Saint Michael's College and while living in Ludlow he coached Black River Academy's football team and played on local semipro teams.

Radigan and several other prospective attorneys were admitted to the Vermont bar on Thursday, October 9, 1930. That night Radigan and four other successful bar applicants were en route to Montreal, Canada for a weekend celebration when they were involved in a car accident in Saint-Jean-sur-Richelieu. Radigan sustained burns and a sprained back and required hospitalization. Another passenger received severe head injuries and required a lengthy hospital stay. The driver of the car died of his injuries the following week.

== Start of career ==
After attaining admission to the bar, Radigan practiced in Ludlow. From 1930 to 1932 he was the town of Ludlow's grand juror (city court prosecutor). In 1932, Radigan returned to Rutland, where he formed a law partnership with Edward G. McClallen Jr. He also became active in the local theater group, the Rutland Players, and acted in several of their productions. In September 1932, Radigan won the Democratic nomination for State's Attorney of Rutland County, but was defeated in the November general election by incumbent Republican Jack A. Crowley. In the early and mid-1930s, Radigan was a title attorney for the United States Department of Agriculture. He continued to practice law in Rutland with different partners at different times, most prominently as a principal in the firm of Abatiell, Radigan & Delliveneri.

== World War II ==
In 1941, Radigan enlisted for military service in World War II. He served in North Africa and Europe as a member of the 17th Field Artillery Regiment, a unit of the 1st Infantry Division. Radigan later served in the office of the Army's Provost Marshal for the Trenton, New Jersey area and was discharged in August 1945. He returned to practicing law in Rutland and from 1946 to 1952 he served as a member of Rutland's Board of Aldermen. From 1949 to 1953, he was Commissioner of the United States District Court for Vermont, with authority for certain judicial functions, including hearing arraignments, setting bail, and acting on applications for search warrants. Radigan's other government activities in the 1950s included service on the state Unemployment Compensation Commission and Rutland-area assistant coordinator for the state Civil Defense program.

== Post-World War II ==
In 1956, Radigan was elected to represent Rutland City in the Vermont House of Representatives and he was reelected in 1958. He served from 1957 to 1961, and was a member of the Judiciary and Municipal Corporations Committees in his first term, and chairman of the Municipal Corporations Committee in his second. During his second term, Radigan served as the House Minority Leader. In 1960, he was the unsuccessful Democratic nominee for Vermont Attorney General. In December 1960, Radigan was appointed to the Vermont Racing Commission, but he resigned in January in order to accept appointment as U.S. Attorney.

== U.S. Attorney ==
In 1961, Radigan was appointed United States Attorney for the District of Vermont by President John F. Kennedy, succeeding Louis G. Whitcomb. He served until 1969, when newly-elected Republican Richard Nixon assumed the Presidency and had the opportunity to appoint Republicans to office. Nixon named George W. F. Cook to succeed Radigan.

Among the notable cases Radigan handled as U.S. Attorney was the prosecution in 1966 and 1967 of State Senator and Vermont Democratic Party chairman Frederick J. Fayette, who was accused of accepting a bribe to influence the appointment of the postmaster in St. Johnsbury. Fayette was convicted and fined $300, and his conviction was affirmed on appeal.

== Civic and professional memberships ==
Radigan was a member of the Knights of Columbus, Elks, and United Commercial Travelers. In addition, he was active in the American Legion, Veterans of Foreign Wars, Disabled American Veterans, and Society of the First Infantry Division. He was also a member of the Rutland County, Vermont, and American Bar associations and the Notre Dame Law Association.

== Retirement and death ==
In retirement, Radigan continued to reside in Rutland. He was diagnosed with cancer in 1975 and died at the hospital in Rutland on August 1, 1975. Radigan was buried at Calvary Cemetery in Rutland.

== Family ==
In February 1945, Radigan married Florence Irene Sabourin (1911-1996) of Rutland, an operator, instructor, and supervisor for the New England Telephone and Telegraph Company. The ceremony took place in Trenton, New Jersey, where Radigan was stationed with the Army after having returned from Europe. They remained married until his death, and had no children.

== Sources ==
=== Books ===
- Armstrong, Howard E. (1961). Vermont Legislative Directory and State Manual. Montpelier, VT: Vermont Secretary of State. p. 682 – via HathiTrust.

=== Newspapers ===
- "Season's Schedule of Black River Academy". Rutland Daily Herald. Rutland, VT. October 18, 1927. p. 11 – via Newspapers.com.
- "Co. B, 172nd Inf., Given Banquet". Rutland Daily Herald. Rutland, VT. March 16, 1928. p. 19 – via Newspapers.com.
- "Appointments of Commissioned Officers in the National Guard". Brattleboro Reformer. Brattleboro, VT. May 20, 1929. p. 1 – via Newspapers.com.
- "Three Rutland Men Admitted to Bar". Rutland Daily Herald. Rutland, VT. October 10, 1930. p. 3 – via Newspapers.com.
- "Foley Dies of Injuries". Brattleboro Reformer. Brattleboro, VT. October 21, 1930. p. 1 – via Newspapers.com.
- "Ludlow Votes to Buy Armory Site". Rutland Daily Herald. Rutland, VT. March 4, 1931. p. 3 – via Newspapers.com.
- "New Law Firm is Organized Here". Rutland Daily Herald. Rutland, VT. January 7, 1932. p. 7 – via Newspapers.com.
- "3 Plays Given for Hospital Benefit". Rutland Daily Herald. Rutland, VT. July 1, 1932. p. 8 – via Newspapers.com.
- "Record Vote Cast in City". Rutland Daily Herald. Rutland, VT. November 9, 1932. p. 7 – via Newspapers.com.
- "Florence I. Sabourin and T/Sgt. Radigan Wed in Trenton, N. J.". Rutland Daily Herald. Rutland, VT. February 27, 1945. p. 7 – via Newspapers.com.
- "Three More Seek Office". Rutland Daily Herald. Rutland, VT. January 7, 1946. p. 7 – via Newspapers.com.
- "Radigan, Hagar to Assist CD Chief Perkins". Rutland Daily Herald. Rutland, VT. February 23, 1951. p. 20 – via Newspapers.com.
- "Radigan Out for House". Rutland Herald. Rutland, VT. July 25, 1956. p. 13 – via Newspapers.com.
- "Radigan Named U.S. Attorney for Vermont". Burlington Free Press. Burlington, VT. Associated Press. May 3, 1961. p. 1 – via Newspapers.com.
- "Legislature Adjournment Likely, Thinks Radigan". Rutland Daily Herald. Rutland, VT. February 7, 1959. p. 8 – via Newspapers.com.
- "Radigan Slated for U.S. District Attorney for Vt". Burlington Free Press. Burlington, VT. Morning Press Bureau. January 11, 1961. p. 7 – via Newspapers.com.
- "Fayette Appeals Influence Case". Burlington Free Press. Burlington, VT. January 20, 1967. p. 17 – via Newspapers.com.
- "Cook to be U.S. District Attorney". Burlington Free Press. Burlington, VT. January 23, 1969. p. 1 – via Newspapers.com.
- "Funeral is Held for Joseph Radigan". Burlington Free Press. Burlington, VT. Associated Press. August 4, 1975. p. 12 – via Newspapers.com.
- "Obituary, Florence S. Radigan". Rutland Herald. Rutland, VT. January 13, 1996. p. 7 – via Newspapers.com.

=== Internet ===
- Hackett, Mary E., Assistant City Clerk (August 3, 1975). "Vermont Death Records, 1909-2008, Entry for Joseph F. Radigan". Ancestry.com. Lehi, UT: Ancestry.com LLC.

Party political offices
Preceded by Peter P. Plante	Democratic nominee for Vermont Attorney General; 1960	Succeeded by Robert W. Larrow
