= Springfield High School (Vermont) =

Coordinates: 43.2814638°N 72.4781448°W

- 303 South Street, Springfield, Vermont; United States

Information
- Type: Public secondary
- School district: Springfield School District
- Principal: Bindy Hathorn
- Teaching staff: 22.77 (FTE)
- Grades: 9–12
- Enrollment: 319 (2023-2024)
- Student to teacher ratio: 14.01
- Colors: Green and white
- Mascot: Cosmos
- Accreditation: New England Association of Schools and Colleges
- Website: https://hs.ssdvt.org/

Springfield High School (SHS) is a public high school in the town of Springfield in southern Vermont, United States. It is part of the Springfield School District and serves students from Springfield and neighboring Weathersfield. SHS is accredited by the New England Association of Schools and Colleges.

== Sports teams ==
In 2008, the football team were the DIII Vermont Champions, capping off a perfect season with a 52- 28 victory over rival Windsor Yellowjackets. The same year, the boys' basketball team were the DII Vermont champions, led by star player and SHS' all-time leader in points scored with 1,609, Grant White, breaking Greg Birsky's 32-year record of 1,436 in 1976. In 2009 the football team were state finalists in the same division.

In 2009, the boys' soccer team won their first Vermont Championship in their 50-year-plus existence. In that same year, the field hockey team made it to the quarter-finals, and the girls' soccer team made it to the semi-finals. In the spring of 2011 the Cosmos varsity softball team won their fourth state championship in school history with a 5–3 win over Lyndon Institute. This was their first title since 1986. In 2012, the girls' soccer team went to their first soccer championship game since 1989. They eventually fell to number 1 seed Montpelier 8–0 at Randolph High School. In 2016 the girls' field hockey team would garner SHS another State Championship with a 1–0 win in the finals against Woodstock at the University of Vermont.

== Curriculum ==
SHS has a working relationship with the River Valley Technical Center (to which it is physically connected) to offer a series of vocational and technical courses.

== Notable alumni and faculty ==
- John M. Pierce - director of co-operative course (1919-1956); writer about amateur telescope making
- Louis G. Whitcomb, class of 1921 - United States Attorney for Vermont
