= Excello, Missouri =

- Census-designated place
- Location within Missouri Location within the United States
- Coordinates: 39°38′01″N 92°28′27″W
- Country: United States
- State: Missouri
- County: Macon County

Area
  - Total: 0.34 sq mi (0.89 km^{2})
  - Land: 0.34 sq mi (0.88 km^{2})
  - Water: 0 sq mi (0.00 km^{2})
- Elevation: 866 ft (264 m)

Population (2020)
  - Total: 61
  - Density: 179.0/sq mi (69.11/km^{2})
- Time zone: UTC-6 (Central (CST))
  - Summer (DST): UTC-5 (PDT)
- ZIP code: 65247
- Area code: 660
- FIPS code: 29-23050
- GNIS feature ID: 2587067

Excello is an unincorporated community and census-designated place (CDP) in southern Macon County, Missouri, United States. As of the 2020 United States census, it had a population of 61.

== History ==
An early variant name was "Emerson". A post office called Excello has been in operation since 1869.

== Geography ==
Excello is located 8 miles (13 km) south of Macon and 16 miles (26 km) north of Moberly, one-half mile west of U.S. Route 63 on State Road T.

According to the U.S. Census Bureau, the Excello CDP has an area of 0.34 square miles (0.88 km^{2}), of which 0.001 square miles (0.6 acres), or 0.29%, are water. The community sits on high ground which drains west toward the East Fork of the Little Chariton River, a tributary of the Missouri River, and east toward Hoover Creek, part of the Salt River watershed flowing directly to the Mississippi.

== Demographics ==
Historical population
Census	Pop.	Note	%±
2010	49		—
2020	61		24.5%
U.S. Decennial Census
