= Helen Hartness Flanders =

American music historian

- Born: Helen Edith Hartness; May 19, 1890; Springfield, Vermont
- Died: May 23, 1972 (aged 82); Springfield, Vermont
- Resting place: Summer Hill Cemetery, Springfield, Vermont
- Education: Dana Hall School
- Known for: Collection of traditional ballads in New England
- Spouse: Ralph Flanders
- Children: 3
- Parent: James and Lena Hartness

Helen Hartness Flanders (May 19, 1890 – May 23, 1972), was an American ballad collector and an authority on the folk music found in New England and the British Isles. At the initiative of the Vermont Commission on Country Life, Flanders commenced a three-decade career capturing traditional songs that were sung in New England—songs that, in many cases, traced their origin to the British Isles. The timing of her life work was critical, coming as it did when people were turning away from traditional music in favor of listening to the radio. Today her nearly 4,500 field recordings, transcriptions and analyses are housed at the Flanders Ballad Collection at Middlebury College, Middlebury, Vermont and have been a resource for scholars and folk singers since the establishment of the collection in 1941.

== Biographical ==
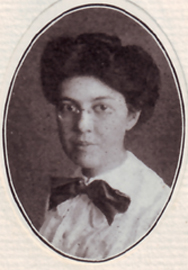
Helen Hartness ca. 1909

Flanders was born in Springfield, Vermont. Her father was James Hartness, inventor, industrialist, and one-term Governor of Vermont, who headed the Jones and Lamson Machine Tool Company in that town. She graduated from the Dana Hall School in 1909, where she sang in the glee club and was a member of the school French club. In 1911 she married Ralph Flanders, a noted American mechanical engineer, industrialist and Republican U.S. Senator (1946–1959) from Vermont. She and her husband maintained homes in Springfield and Washington, D.C. where they entertained friends who included Dorothy Canfield Fisher and Robert Frost. They had three children: Elizabeth, (born in 1912), Anna (also known as Nancy—born in 1918), and James (born in 1923). Elizabeth helped her mother from time to time with collecting and transcribing tunes. In addition to her writings on traditional ballads, Flanders published two small volumes of poetry and one children's play. She traveled with her husband to the British Isles, Europe and Australia on various occasions.

== Ballad and folk song collecting ==
=== Background ===
In 1930, Vermont Governor John E. Weeks invited Flanders to join the Committee on Traditions and Ideals of the Vermont Commission on Country Life. That committee asked her to collect Vermont folk songs, which were passed along orally from one person to another. In the 1930s, people in New England were turning to music on the radio; as a result, interest in traditional songs was on the wane. Flanders understood that unless these songs were collected and recorded for posterity, they would die along with the people who sang them. What began as a committee assignment became not just a hobby, but a passion. She continued collecting for three decades.

=== Collection methodology ===
Flanders with Eveline K. Fairbanks (right), one of the singers whose traditional songs she recorded, showing the recording equipment that she used.

The availability of portable recording devices was key to Flanders's ability to collect music from singers in remote parts of New England. Initially, she recorded on wax cylinders; then from 1939 to 1949, on aluminum and acetate discs; and in later years, on reel-to-reel tapes. On occasions when electricity was not available in a singer's home, Flanders plugged a recorder into the cigarette lighter of her car.

Flanders expanded her quest throughout New England and to New York State. The singers that she found came from all walks of life; the majority of them were elderly. Flanders made field recordings with George Brown in 1930, then with the occasional help of Phillips Barry between 1931 and 1937, and with Alan Lomax in 1939. From 1940–1958 Flanders continued to collect, but Marguerite Olney was responsible for major contributions both in the collection management and in the field.

Between 1930 and 1939, Flanders focused mostly on collecting Child ballads. This explains the proportionately large number of those ballads on cylinders. Of the 150 recordings made on disc with Alan Lomax, there were songs, stories and fiddle tunes. Over time, the scope of the field recordings would include religious songs, children's songs, 19th-century American popular songs, dance tunes, as well as folktales.

George Brown, his mother, Alice Brown, Phillips Barry, Marguerite Olney and Elizabeth Flanders Ballard all made musical transcriptions of songs for Flanders's publications. An index of all the field recordings (collected between 1930 and 1958) was published in 1983.

=== The collection and its significance ===
In 1941 when there was no longer enough space to store the collection in Flanders's home, she donated it to Middlebury College in Vermont. Today the Flanders Ballad Collection is housed in Special Collections and includes not only her papers but nearly 4,500 field recordings. Copies of these recordings are also available at the American Folklife Center of the Library of Congress and at Harvard University. The American Folklife Center also has files of Flanders's correspondence.

Flanders demonstrated that when songs migrated from the British Isles or Europe, the texts would sometimes undergo changes as singers inserted details from their life in the new world. For example, the "Yorkshire Bite" became the "New Hampshire Bite." Many of the stories in these ballads and folksongs describe aspects of life in New England and Colonial history.

In recognition of her accomplishments as a ballad collector, Middlebury College awarded Flanders an honorary Master of Arts in 1942. She was a member of the National Committee of the National Folk Festival Association and vice president of the Folksong Society of the Northeast. In 1966, the Vermont House of Representatives added Flanders's name to the state's Roll of Distinction in the Arts.

== Legacy ==
=== Promoting an interest in traditional ballads ===
Flanders was the author of eight books on ballads and folk music; she also wrote pamphlets, newspaper and magazine articles, and two books of poetry. She wrote a regular column on ballads for the Springfield Sunday Union and Republican (Massachusetts) during the 1930s.

=== Performers of traditional ballads ===
Through their concerts and recordings, numerous folksingers have promoted interest in the Flanders Ballad Collection. Foremost among these was ballad singer Margaret MacArthur (1928–2006) who moved to Vermont in the late 1940s. During their ten-year friendship, Flanders encouraged her singing and gave her copies of the field recordings. Although also a collector of traditional songs in New England, MacArthur was especially known in the United States and abroad for her repertoire (and many recordings) of songs derived from the Flanders Collection. More recently, Vermonter Deborah Flanders performed and recorded songs collected by her great-aunt Helen.

=== Flanders Ballad Collection at Middlebury College ===
The Flanders Ballad Collection at Middlebury College is organized, as follows:

1. Materials related to field collecting, 1930-1958: The original field recordings consist of 254 wax cylinders. Those recorded on discs comprise the largest body with a variety of songs, a few interviews and stories. Flanders made 77 discs with Alan Lomax, which are catalogued in the Library of Congress. There are 60 discs that contain songs recorded in Vermont, New Hampshire, and Maine between 1940 and 1947; and 61 that contain fiddle and dance music from all the New England states (16 collected with Alan Lomax); nine discs of fife music made in Massachusetts; and from the 1950s, approximately 55 tapes made on a reel-to-reel recorder.
2. Manuscript and typescript materials derived directly from field research, 1930-60: Flanders and Marguerite Olney subdivided song texts into the following categories: Child ballads (89 titles), 635 other British song titles (broadsides and others), and 593 American titles. Among these, there were 114 "stage songs" (British and American popular songs from the 19th-early 20th centuries), 73 religious titles and 122 children's songs.
3. Correspondence, publication materials, lectures and exhibits derived largely from field work, 1931-1967: including Flanders's correspondence with scholars, articles about her collecting experiences; information about ballad lectures given over a 30-year period throughout New England and in the Washington, D.C. area.
4. Supporting materials not directly related to field work, 1930-1960: original manuscripts, copybooks, and miscellaneous sheets which contain over 300 songs and tunes—including ballads, broadsides, fiddle and fife tunes which were transcribed between the 18th and the early 20th centuries.
5. Collection administration, 1940-1967: papers relating to the general operation of the collection.
6. Personal papers, 1941-65: a limited number personal notes from friends of Helen Flanders and photographs of members of the Flanders family.

== Bibliography ==
- Flanders, Helen Hartness (1934). A Garland of Green Mountain Song. Northfield, Vt.: Vermont Commission on Country Life.
- Flanders, Helen Hartness (1934). Gypsy Daisy came over the hills. Springfield, Vt.: Springfield Printing Corporation.
- Flanders, Helen Hartness (1927). Looking out of Jimmie. New York: E.P. Dutton & Co.
- Flanders, Helen Hartness; Brown, George (1932). Vermont Folk-Songs & Ballads. Brattleboro, Vt.: Stephen Daye Press.
- Flanders, Helen Hartness (June 1939). "The quest for Vermont ballads". Proceedings of the Vermont Historical Society. VII (2): 53–72.
- Flanders, Helen Hartness (1937). Country Songs of Vermont. New York: G. Schirmer, Inc.
- Flanders, Helen Hartness (June 1939). "Index of ballads and folk-songs in the Archive of Vermont Folk-Songs at Smiley Manse, Springfield, Vermont". Proceedings of the Vermont Historical Society. VII (2): 73–97.
- Flanders, Helen Hartness; Ballard, E.F.; Brown, G.; Barry, P. (1939). The New Green Mountain Songster: Traditional Folk Songs of Vermont. New Haven: Yale University Press.
- Flanders, Helen Hartness; Olney, Marguerite (1953). Ballads Migrant in New England. New York: Farrar, Straus, and Young.
- Flanders, Helen Hartness (1960–1965). Ancient Ballads Traditionally Sung in New England, Volumes 1-4. Philadelphia: University of Pennsylvania Press.
