= Black River Produce =

Black River Produce is a food processor and distributor located in Springfield, Vermont.

The company was founded in 1978 in Ludlow, Vermont by Mark Curran and Steve Birge, who began transporting fresh produce from Boston to Vermont. The company later relocated to Proctorsville, before in 2004 moving into its current headquarters and primary distribution facility in North Springfield. Black River largely buys produce, dairy products, and meats from Vermont suppliers, supplemented by other regional sources, particularly for flowers and seafood.

Black River operates two major facilities in Springfield—a 63,000 square foot headquarters, warehouse and distribution center, and a 50,000 square foot meat processing facility. While the company had handled exclusively produce in-house for most of its history, outsourcing its meat processing, in the mid-2000s it began to consider beginning to process meat as it encountered supply chain problems with increased volume. In 2012, it purchased a former Ben & Jerry's plant in Springfield for $125,000 and planned $1 million in renovations to convert it to process meat. The processing plant opened in 2013, at a final cost of $5 million, and consolidated the company's beef, lamb, pork, and seafood processing into one facility. By 2014, a slaughterhouse had been constructed at the plant, with several smokers also being installed, at a cost of another $4 million.

As of 2014, Black River supplied about 3,000 customers, and had roughly $70 million in annual sales, while employing 180 people.

In October 2016, Black River Produce announced that it will be sold to Chicago-based Reinhart Foodservice, LLC.

== See also ==
- List of food companies
