= 1920 Vermont gubernatorial election =

- November 2, 1920
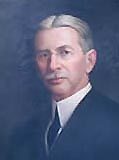

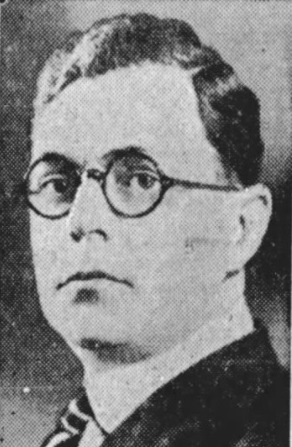
Nominee	James Hartness	Fred C. Martin
Party	Republican	Democratic
Popular vote	67,674	18,917
Percentage	78.00%	21.80%
- Hartness: 50–60% 60–70% 70–80% 80–90% 90-100% Martin: 50–60% No Vote/Data
Governor before election
Percival W. Clement
Republican
Elected Governor
James Hartness
Republican

The 1920 Vermont gubernatorial election took place on November 2, 1920. Incumbent Republican Percival W. Clement, per the "Mountain Rule", did not run for re-election to a second term as Governor of Vermont. Republican candidate James Hartness defeated Democratic candidate Fred C. Martin to succeed him.

== Republican primary ==
=== Results ===
Republican primary results
Party	Candidate	Votes	%	±%
Republican	James Hartness	23,733	39.2	
Republican	Frank W. Agan	12,844	21.2	
Republican	Curtis S. Emery	12,489	20.6	
Republican	Fred H. Babbitt	11,413	18.9	
Republican	Other	1	0.0	
Total votes		60,480	100.0	

== Democratic primary ==
=== Results ===
Democratic primary results
Party	Candidate	Votes	%	±%
Democratic	Fred C. Martin	3,406	99.6	
Democratic	Other	12	0.4	
Total votes		3,418	100.0	

== General election ==
=== Results ===
1920 Vermont gubernatorial election
Party	Candidate	Votes	%	±%
Republican	James Hartness	66,494	76.64	
Prohibition	James Hartness	1,180	1.36	
Total	James Hartness	67,674	78.00	
Democratic	Fred C. Martin	18,917	21.80	
N/A	Other	171	0.20	
Total votes		86,762	100.0	
