= James Hartness =

American engineer and Vermont politician (1861–1934)

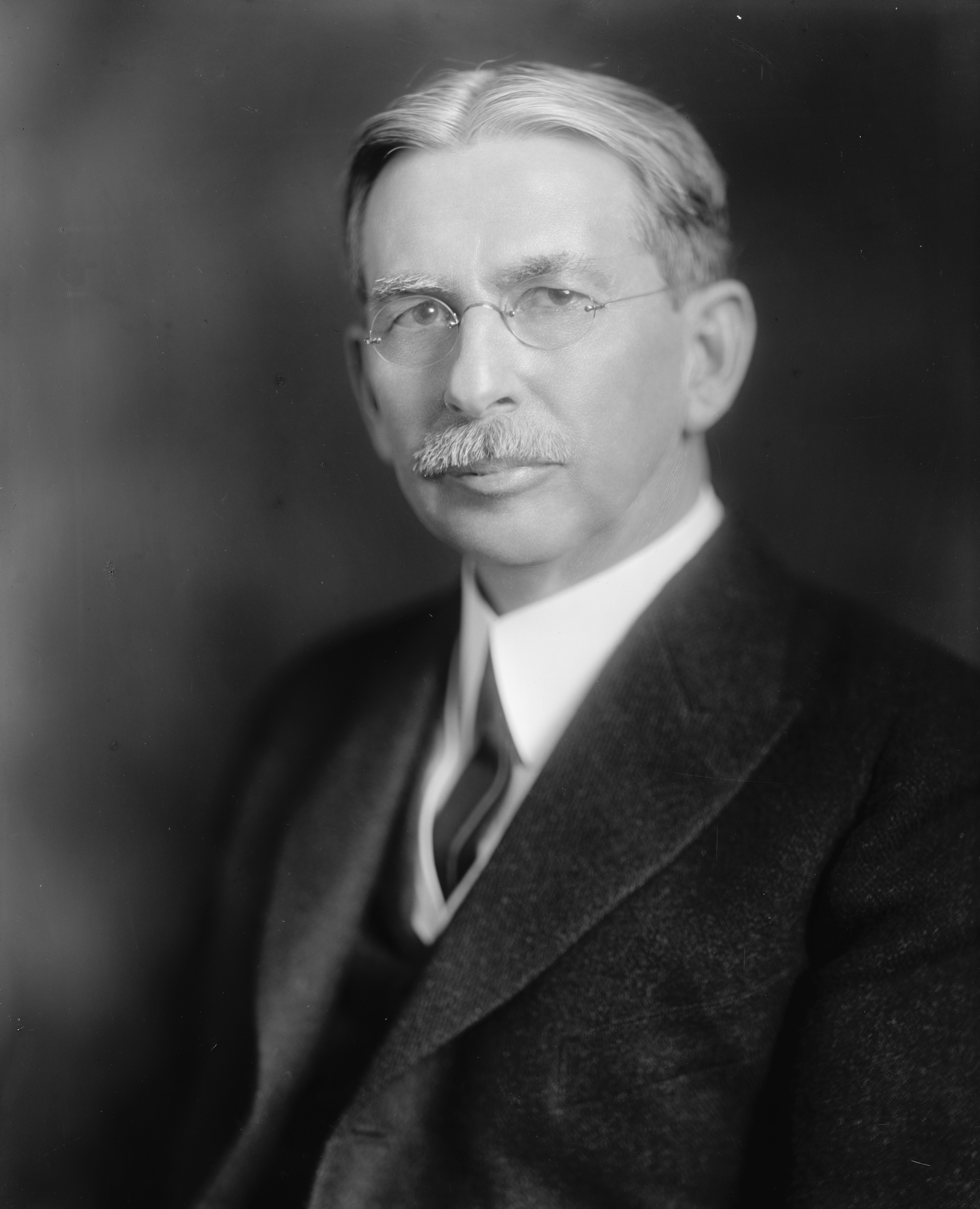

58th Governor of Vermont
- In office January 6, 1921 – January 4, 1923
- Lieutenant: Abram W. Foote
- Preceded by: Percival W. Clement
- Succeeded by: Redfield Proctor Jr.

Chairman of the Vermont State Board of Education
- In office 1915–1920
- Preceded by: Guy Potter Benton
- Succeeded by: Luther B. Johnson

Member of the Vermont State Board of Education
- In office 1914–1920
- Preceded by: John Martin Thomas
- Succeeded by: Fred A. Howland

Personal details
- Born: September 3, 1861 Schenectady, New York, U.S.
- Died: February 2, 1934 (aged 72) Springfield, Vermont, U.S.
- Resting place: Summer Hill Cemetery, Springfield, Vermont, U.S.
- Party: Republican
- Spouse: Lena Pond (m. 1885)
- Children: 2 (including Helen Hartness Flanders)
- Relatives: Minnie Hartness (sister-in-law)
- Profession: Business executive

James Hartness (September 3, 1861 – February 2, 1934) was an American business executive, inventor, mechanical engineer, entrepreneur, amateur astronomer, and politician who served as the 58th governor of Vermont from 1921 to 1923.

== Early life and education ==
Hartness was born in Schenectady, New York, one of three sons of John William Hartness and Ursilla (Jackson) Hartness. His family moved to Cleveland, Ohio, in 1863, where his father worked as a foreman in the city's machine shops. Hartness was educated in the public schools of Cleveland until he was 16, when he became an apprentice machinist.

== Career ==
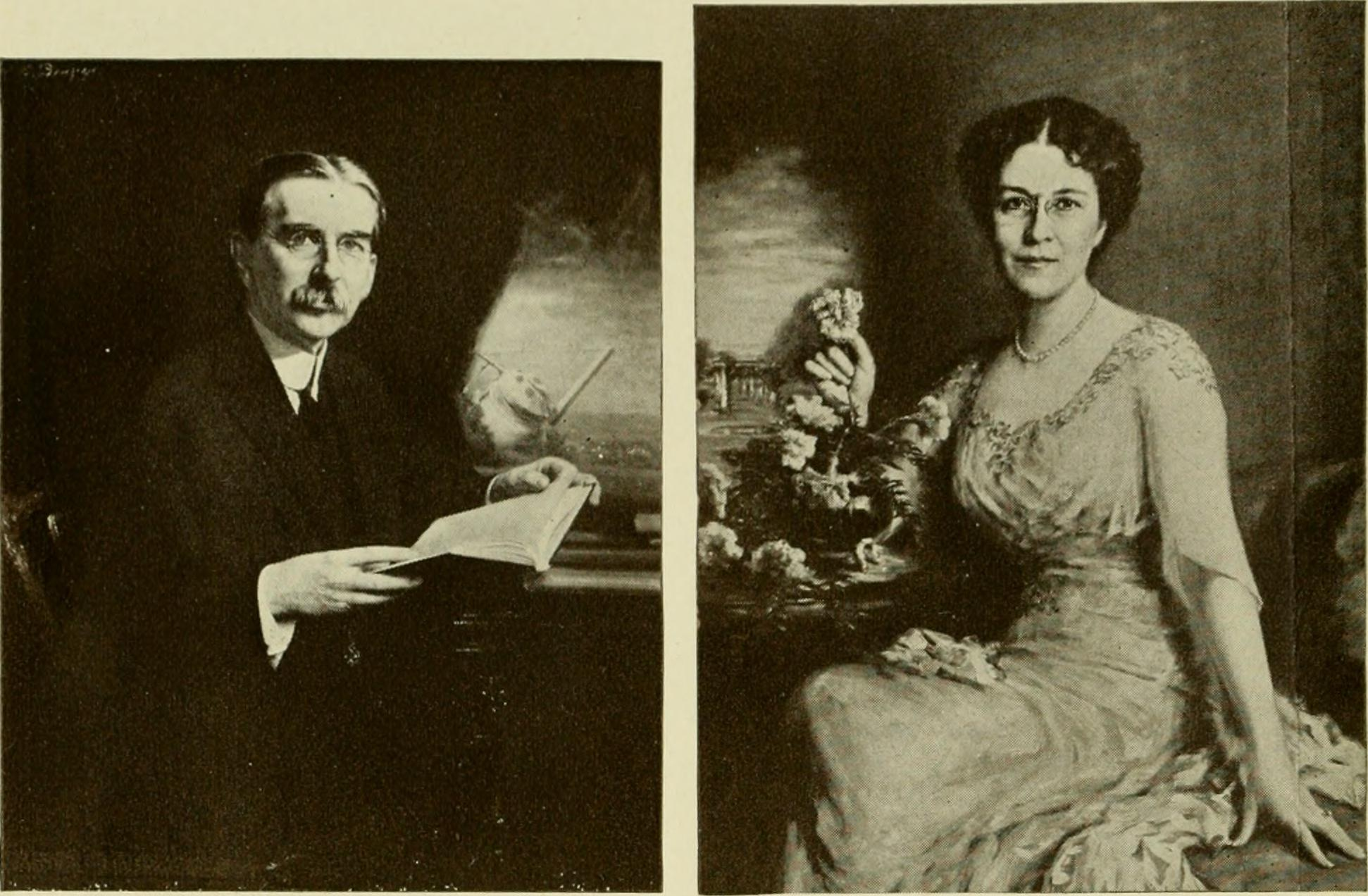
Hartness and his wife

Hartness worked up through the ranks in machine shops in Connecticut before moving to Springfield, Vermont. He became one of the nation's first aviators and became a one-term governor of the state of Vermont. In 1885, he married Lena Pond in Winsted, Connecticut. They were the parents of two daughters, Anna and Helen. Helen became a noted collector of traditional ballads, having married Ralph Flanders, a mechanical engineer and then U.S. Senator from Vermont.

He built his Springfield home in 1904, which is an example of shingle style architecture. An inn and restaurant since 1954, it is listed on the National Register of Historic Places for its connection to him.

=== Engineering and entrepreneurship ===
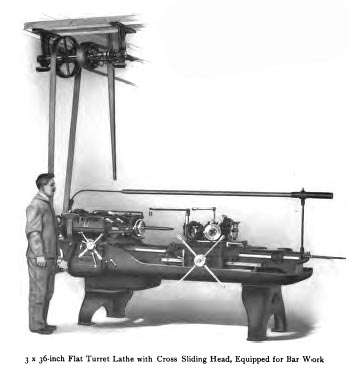
Hartness 3x36 flat turret lathe with cross sliding head, equipped for bar work.

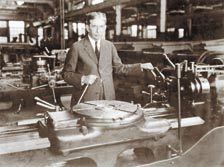
James Hartness with his most successful invention, the flat turret lathe, c. 1920. Jones & Lamson publicity photo.

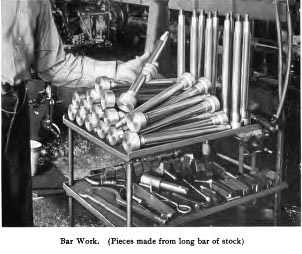
Bar work—Pieces made by a turret lathe from a long bar of stock.

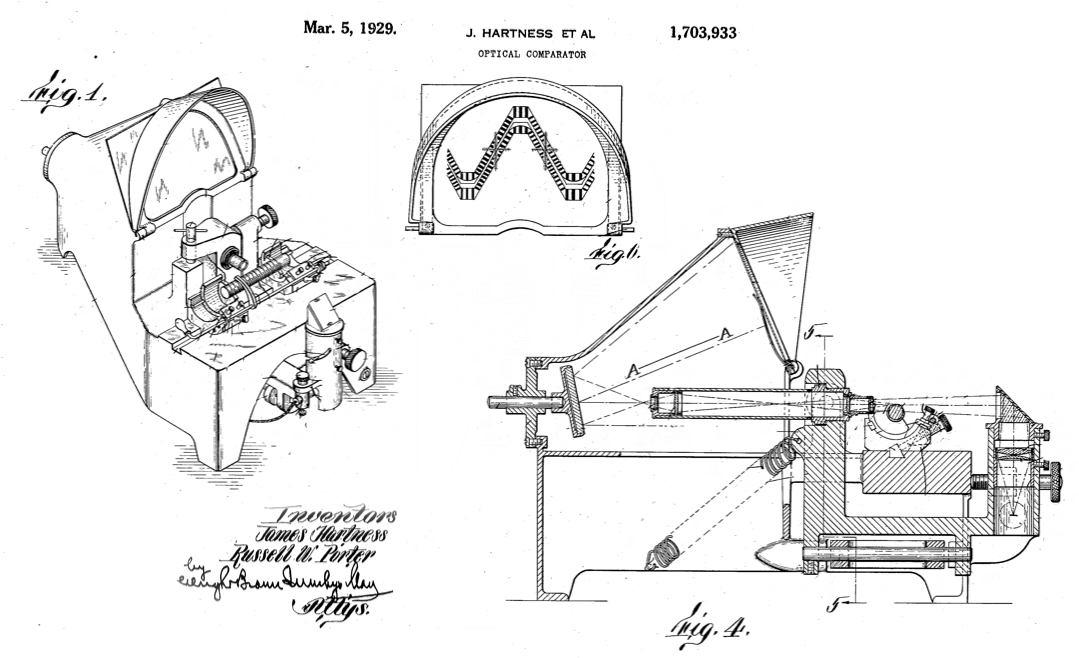
Patent drawings for Hartness screw-thread optical comparator.

At age 16, Hartness began his career in machine shops. At age 21 he became a foreman at the Winsted-Norway Bolt Company in Winsted, Connecticut. He moved in 1886 to Torrington, Connecticut, to work as a tool-maker and foreman at the Union Hardware Company. His lifetime achievement of more than 100 patents began here with patents of locks, roller skates, and bicycle pedal mechanisms.

Hartness had an unpleasant experience at Union Hardware: he had been understandably naive about arranging for royalties on his patents, and the business owners chose not to help rectify the oversight. He did not get to share in the profits derived from the patents. In September 1888, after he had lost several weeks' work to illness, Union Hardware told him not to return.

During the winter of 1888–1889, he worked briefly for several companies: Pratt & Whitney in Hartford, Connecticut; Eaton, Cole and Burnham Co. in Bridgeport, Connecticut, and a plant in Scottdale, Pennsylvania. Roe (1937) surmised that Hartness developed the idea of the flat-turret lathe sometime before this period and sought a suitable machine tool company at which to build it. Only Ambrose Swasey of Warner & Swasey saw the potential for success of Hartness' idea, reportedly saying "You will hear from that young man again, and from this 'Lazy Susan' of his".

In April 1889 Hartness moved to Springfield, Vermont, to become the superintendent at the struggling Jones and Lamson (J&L) Machine Company. He used his creative energy to revitalize the company. Here he found his chance to manufacture the flat-turret lathe, which increased efficiency and productivity and was especially well adapted to the burgeoning automobile industry. The flat turret lathe improved upon earlier turret lathes via greater rigidity, allowing higher precision, higher speeds and feeds, and longer cuts. Hartness also developed an array of highly advanced tooling to complement the lathe, including improved roller bar feed and die head designs. All of these advantages allowed better parts to be made faster, and thus less expensively, which made the lathe highly desirable to manufacturers. This time, Hartness was prepared to defend his interest in his patent. He arranged with J&L to receive a $100 royalty on each machine.

Hartness changed J&L's business model from making a wide variety of machines to order to specializing in the manufacturing and improving of this one product. With rapid acceptance of this machine tool, orders reached 10 units per day from the manufacturing sector. As a result, Hartness reportedly received up to $1,000 per day in royalties. He also introduced appealing and informative catalogues to market the new Jones and Lamson products. Hartness acquired a large interest in J&L. He became manager in 1896 and president in 1901 until his retirement in 1933.

In 1915 Hartness reluctantly decided to engage in "war business," heeding his brother John's pleas from the London office of J&L. During World War I Hartness, as a representative of American Society of Mechanical Engineers (ASME), became Chairman of the National Screw-Thread Commission, the mission of which was to create international standards for the measurement and sizing of screw threads.

Hartness discouraged modernizing of the Hartness Flat Turret Lathe. Nevertheless, it remained a very successful product until after Hartness's retirement, when a new J&L turret lathe model by John Lovely finally replaced it.

The 1921 edition of the ASME mechanical catalog and directory showed that J&L offered several models of Hartness flat turret lathe, an automatic chucking lathe, an automatic die, a screw-thread comparator, and the Fay automatic lathe. J&L had offices in Springfield, Vermont, San Francisco, California, and London, England, plus agents in five other countries.

In 1929, Hartness and Russell W. Porter patented an optical comparator, a device that applies the principles of optics to the inspection of manufactured parts by projecting the magnified silhouette of a part onto a screen where its dimensions and geometry of the part are measured against prescribed limits. Traditionally, mechanics used a mechanical gauge to assess whether screws were to specifications. Hartness employed his knowledge of optics and magnification to devise a much more practical optical method for measurement. This contribution stemmed from Hartness' work as the Chairman of the U.S. National Screw-Thread Commission and from his familiarity with optics in astronomy and telescope-building. The Hartness Screw-Thread Comparator was for many years a profitable product for J&L. The optical comparator remains a standard means inspection of many kinds of parts.

==== Mentor of machine tool entrepreneurs ====
Hartness encouraged talented inventors in his employ at J&L to strike out on their own as entrepreneurs. These included three Springfield companies and one Windsor, Vermont company:

- Edwin R. Fellows, founder of the Fellows Gear Shaper Company
- William L. Bryant, founder of the Bryant Chucking Grinder Company
- Fred P. Lovejoy, founder of the Lovejoy Tool Company
- George O. Gridley, founder of the National Acme Company

The companies started by these men helped make Springfield and Windsor a prosperous manufacturing region, thanks not to its access to raw materials or markets, but due to a pool of talented engineers and machinists. Joseph Roe ranked Hartness in the class of Henry Maudslay and Elisha K. Root for his mentorship of a younger generation of machine tool builders.

==== Management ====
His son-in-law, Ralph Flanders, reported that Hartness examined "some of the elements which go into making workmen both contented and productive" in his book The Human Factor in Works Management. His Hartness Turret Lathe Manual starts with the statement, "Since the machine is only an implement, it cannot be considered a thing entirely apart from the man. In fact, the man is the greater part. The personal welfare of the operator must be considered. This is something more than the man's relation to the machine. It includes an equally important phase—his relationship to other men and to his environment in general."

In a sense Hartness was responding to the era's enthusiastic fervor for scientific management, which Hartness and many others felt did not adequately address the psychology of how to manage employees as human beings and maintain their respect.

=== Affiliations, degrees and medals ===
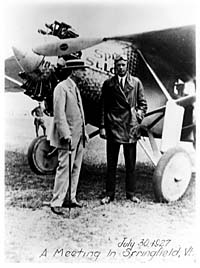
James Hartness with Charles Lindbergh at Springfield, Vermont's airport in July, 1927. Image courtesy of Springfield Art & Historical Society.

Hartness was an active member of the following engineering, scientific, and arts societies:

- American Society of Mechanical Engineers, which elected him president in Fall 1913 to serve the 1914–1915 term
- American Engineering Council (formerly the Federated American Engineering Societies), which elected him president in 1924 to serve the following two-year term
- Society of Automotive Engineers
- British Institution of Mechanical Engineers
- American Association for the Advancement of Science (Fellow)
- British Royal Aeronautical Society (Fellow)
- American Astronomical Society (Member)
- British Royal Astronomical Society (Member)
- British Royal Society for the Encouragement of Arts (Member)
- Aero Club of America
- Aero Club of Vermont

His life achievements were recognized with honorary degrees from the University of Vermont (ME in 1910 and LLD in 1920) and Yale University (MA in 1914). The Franklin Institute awarded Hartness the Edward Longstreth Medal in 1921, recognizing his invention of the Hartness screw thread comparator. In the same year the American Philosophical Society and the City Trusts of Philadelphia awarded the John Scott Medal to Hartness for the flat turret lathe, citing its usefulness in making artillery.

=== Aviation ===
Hartness first flew in Germany in 1913 in a hydrogen-filled airship, designed by Ferdinand von Zeppelin. In 1914, Hartness learned to fly a 35 horsepower (26 kW) Wright Flyer near Garden City, New York. Hartness then obtained his pilot's license from the Aero Club of America. He encouraged, and served as president of, the Vermont Aero Club. He donated the land for the Springfield Aerodrome to the state, establishing the first airfield in Vermont—Hartness State Airport.

After his trans-Atlantic flight, Charles Lindbergh toured the United States in the Spirit of St. Louis to promote aviation. He landed in Springfield on July 26, 1927 in his visit to Vermont and spoke at a large gathering at the airport. Hartness hosted Lindbergh at his home.

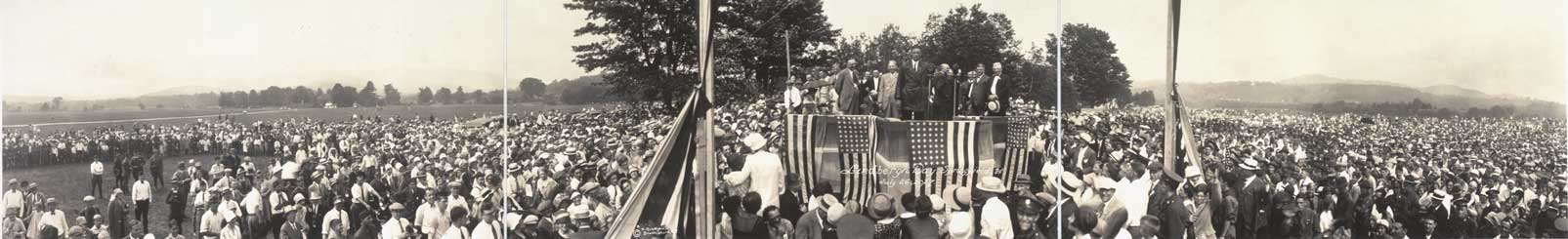
Crowd attending celebration of Charles Lindbergh's arrival at Springfield, Vermont's airport in July, 1927. Image courtesy of Springfield Art & Historical Society.

=== Astronomy ===
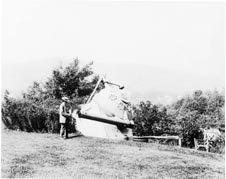
Hartness's Equatorial-Plane Turret Telescope located at his home in Springfield, Vermont, c. 1912.

Hartness's interest in optics and astronomy led to his development of a telescope mount with the revolving dome on an equatorial plane. An additional feature of this telescope, which still stands at the former Hartness Mansion, was that the optics of the telescope passed through a lens in the wall of the dome. This allowed the observer to stay warm in winter. (Conventional telescopes were often contained within domes that opened an aperture for the telescope to gain exposure both to the sky and the ambient air.) The success of this patent led to more telescope activities and commissions. With Hartness's encouragement and financial support, Russell W. Porter initiated the Springfield Telescope Makers Club. The club still celebrates their annual Stellafane gathering in Springfield.

== Politics and government ==
Hartness was a member of the Vermont Board of Education from 1914 until 1920, and served as its chairman from 1915 to 1920. Under his leadership, the board took steps to standardize teacher training and improve the physical condition of Vermont's small rural schools. During World War I, he was appointed Federal Food Administrator for Vermont. Food administrators were responsible for contributing to the war effort by leading campaigns to promote food conservation and production among the public, including "Meatless Monday" and "Wheatless Wednesday", as well as the cultivation of Victory gardens.

=== Governor of Vermont ===
A Republican, in 1920, Hartness ran for the party's gubernatorial nomination. An advocate of passing the Nineteenth Amendment to the United States Constitution, he decided to take advantage of the expanded electorate when women were permitted to vote, as well as the primary elections that had replaced state party conventions, to bypass the party's Mountain Rule and campaign directly for the nomination. In the primary, Hartness obtained 39 percent of the vote, defeating three well-established candidates. In the general election, Hartness campaigned on the issue of enticing Vermonters to stay rather than seek employment elsewhere. He easily bested Democrat Fred C. Martin, 78 percent to 21.8.

Unlike most governors of Vermont, Hartness had not previously served in the Vermont General Assembly. During his 1921 to 1923 term, he worked to improve Vermont's road network and promote manufacturing as the key to expanding the state's economy. Hartness adhered to the Mountain Rule provision that limited governors to one term and did not seek reelection in 1922.

== Death and burial ==
Hartness died in Springfield on February 2, 1934. He was buried at Summer Hill Cemetery in Springfield.

== Bibliography ==
=== Books by Hartness ===
- Hartness, James (1909), Machine building for profit, and the Hartness flat turret lathe, Jones & Lamson Machine Company, OCLC 3808005
- Hartness, James (1910), Hartness flat turret lathe manual: a hand book for operators, Springfield, Vermont and London: Jones & Lamson Machine Company, ISBN 9780282208783, OCLC 49472727
- Hartness, James (1912), The human factor in works management, New York and London: McGraw-Hill, OCLC 1065709
  - Republished by Hive Publishing Company as Hive management history series no. 46, ISBN 978-0-87960-047-1
- Hartness, James (1920), The Hartness screw thread comparator for accurate and rapid screw gaging, Jones & Lamson Machine Company, OCLC 53066316
- Hartness, James (1921), Industrial progress and human economics, Commissioner of Industries, ISBN 978-1-4495-5081-3, OCLC 2867366
  - Republished by Kessinger Publishing, 2004, as ISBN 978-1-4191-2645-1

=== Biography ===
- Roe, Joseph Wickham (1937), James Hartness: A Representative of the Machine Age at Its Best, New York: American Society of Mechanical Engineers, LCCN 37016470, OCLC 3456642. link from HathiTrust.

=== Other cited sources ===
- American Society of Mechanical Engineers (1921), A.S.M.E. mechanical catalog and directory, Volume 11, American Society of Mechanical Engineers
- Flanders, Ralph (1961), Senator from Vermont, Boston: Little, Brown, OCLC 1373679
- Franklin Institute (1921), "Report of the Committee on Meetings", 1921 Yearbook of the Franklin Institute
- Hartness, James; Porter, Russell (1929), United States Patent 1703933: Optical comparator, U.S. Patent Office
- New York Times (April 23, 1921), "Honors awarded by philosophers, Governor Hartness wins the John Scott Medal for lathe used in artillery, another for Mme. Curie, Stewart Paton, in address, calls radicalism and bolshevism result of cowardice.", New York Times
- Smith, Kennedy (2002), Shedding light on optical comparators—How much better can this type of system get?, Quality Digest: QCI International
- Springfield Reporter (February 9, 1934), "Springfield in Mourning as Last Rites are Held for James Hartness Inventor, Scientist and Ex-Governor", Springfield (Vermont) Reporter
- Wicks, Frank (November 1999), Renaissance tool man, The American Society of Mechanical Engineers, archived from the original on March 2, 2008
- Willard, Bert (2015), A Brief History of Stellafane, The Springfield Telescope Makers, Inc.

Party political offices
| Preceded by Percival W. Clement | Republican nominee for Governor of Vermont; 1920 | Succeeded by Redfield Proctor Jr. |
Political offices
| Preceded by Percival W. Clement | Governor of Vermont; 1921–1923 | Succeeded by Redfield Proctor Jr. |
