= Asahel Lynde Powers =

American painter

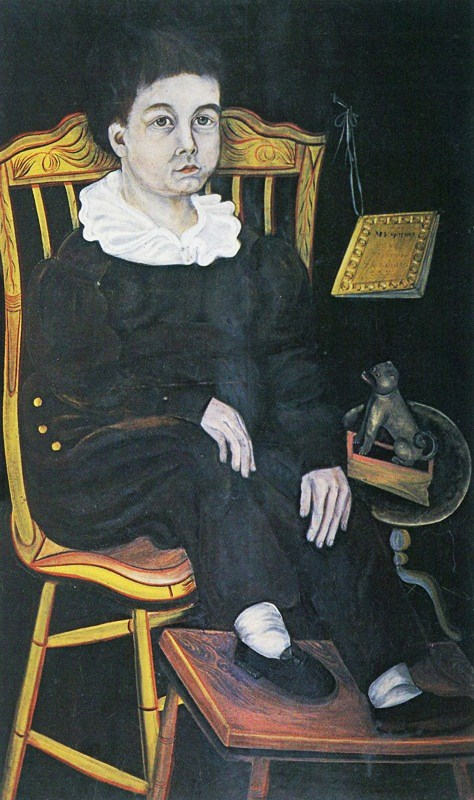
Charles Mortimer French by Asahel Lynde Powers

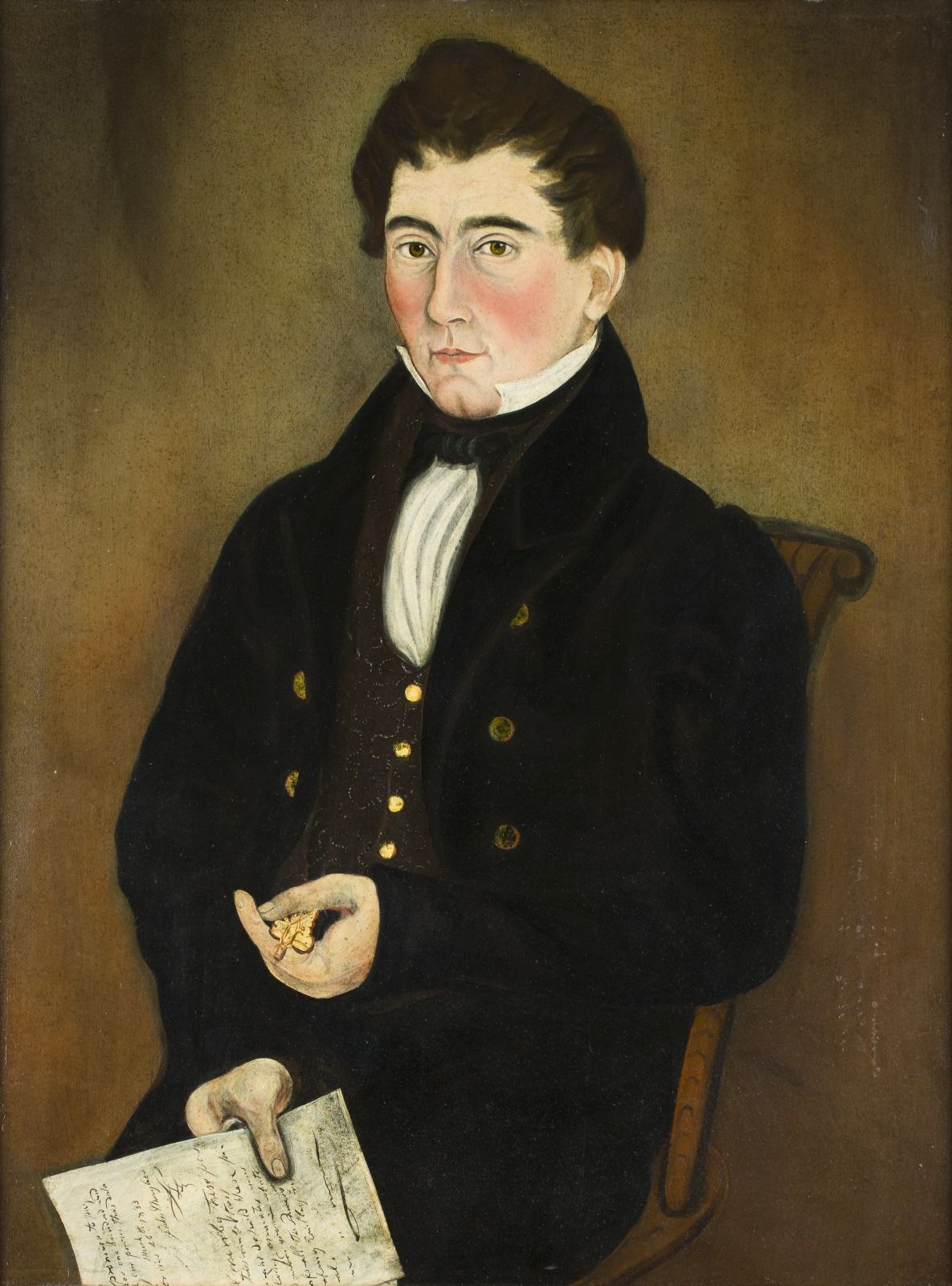
John Mayhew attributed to Asahel Lynde Powers

Asahel Lynde Powers (February 28, 1813 – 1843) was an American painter active in New England.

Powers was born in Springfield, Vermont, and began his career as an itinerant artist at an early age. At 18 years old, Powers was already well-known. The first portrait attributed to him is of Dr. Joel Green from Rutland, Vermont, dated 1831, now on display in the Springfield Art and Historical Society. Like many contemporary paintings, Powers' early works were oil on wood panel. During the 1830s, Powers traveled through Vermont, Massachusetts, and New Hampshire. From 1839 to 1841 he worked in New York's Clinton and Franklin counties. In the early 1840s, he moved to Olney, Illinois. There are no known works from his time in Illinois, where he died in 1843.
