= Margaret MacArthur =

- Margaret holding her custom-luthiered MacArthur Harp and mountain dulcimer with heart-shaped soundholes

Background information
- Born: Margaret Crowl MacArthur; 7 May 1928; Chicago
- Origin: Chicago University
- Died: 23 May 2006 (aged 78) Marlboro, Vermont, U.S.
- Genre: Traditional folk music
- Instruments: mountain dulcimer, MacArthur harp, zither, acoustic guitar
- Years active: 1961—2006
- Label: Smithsonian Folkways
- Spinoffs: Tony Barrand
- Spinoff of: Helen Hartness Flanders

Margaret Crowl MacArthur (7 May 1928 – 23 May 2006) was an American singer and player of the MacArthur Harp and lap dulcimer.

== Biography ==
Margaret Crowl MacArthur was born in Chicago. As a youth, she travelled with her family in South Carolina, California, Louisiana, and Arizona. Her family nickname would become “Toodles.”

Crowl remembered that at the age of five, she heard cowboys on the timber crew singing folk songs in the Tonto National Forest. Later in life she would become a collector of Native American artwork.

Crowl studied at Chicago University. In 1948 she married John MacArthur and moved to Newfane, Vermont. She remained in Vermont for the rest of her life. In 1951 the couple moved into a 200-year-old farmhouse in Marlboro, Vermont without electricity. In preparation for the move, she bought "Country Songs of Vermont" (1937) by Helen Hartness Flanders. It became the model for her future folk-song collecting. MacArthur volunteered to teach music at the school her children attended. She found old ballads appealing and she sought out traditional singers in the Vermont area. By 1951 she had performed several times on local radio.

In 1960 an 80-year-old neighbor gave her an old harp-zither. Her husband repaired it and customized it, and Margaret became its only living performer. An instrument manufacturer was impressed and obtained permission to manufacture copies of it, calling it the MacArthur Harp.

In 1962 she signed to Folkways Records at the insistence of Pete Seeger. Her first album, "Folksongs of Vermont", was recorded in her kitchen. In 1985 at the New England arts biennial, officials named MacArthur as one of the seven "living art treasures of New England." In 1997 she represented Vermont at the Kennedy Center in a national celebration of the arts. In 2001 "Yankee Magazine" voted "Vermont Ballads and Broadsides" as one of "The Yankee Top 40" of all time. In 2003 she performed at the Brattleboro Free Folk Festival.

== Death and Legacy ==
Margaret MacArthur died in the Spring of 2006 of Mad Cow Disease, which she contracted from ingesting local meat. Despite this, she could still sing and remember any song from her repertoire until her death.

The Margaret MacArthur Collection, consisting of personal papers, books, her field recordings of traditional singers in Vermont, and materials gifted to her by Helen Hartness Flanders, resides in the archive of the Vermont Folklife Center in Middlebury, VT.

The MacArthur archive was digitally curated by M. Shelley, who worked with MacArthur’s folksong partner Tony Barrand in 2016 to publish new materials from the MacArthur collection’s Fred Atwood sessions. During this research period, Margaret MacArthur’s widower died of a hip injury when he fell on ice getting tires from his garage; this was included in his obituary. Like MacArthur, Tony Barrand also died of a neurodegenerative disease (multiple sclerosis) in 2022, having been confined to a motorized wheelchair for several decades. Barrand’s own wife Margaret Dale died a week later.

== Bibliography ==
- How to Play the MacArthur Harp and all Numerical Harp-Zithers (1987) (book and cassette)
- The Vermont Heritage Songbook (Editor with Gregory Sharrow) (1994)
- On the Banks of Coldbrook (posthumous transcription credits for Tony Barrand) (2018)

== Discography ==
- "Folksongs of Vermont" (1962)
- "On The Mountains High" (1972)
- "The Old Songs" (1976)
- "An Almanac of New England Farm Songs" (1982)
- "Make the Wildwood Ring" (1982)
- "Vermont Ballads and Broadsides" (1989)
- "MacArthur Road" (1989)
- "Them Stars" (1995)
- "Ballads Thrice Twisted" (1999)

== Sources ==
- Clayson, Alan (12 June 2006). "Margaret MacArthur: A musician and historian who recorded the sounds of Vermont". The Guardian.
- "Margaret MacArthur: Vermont's Songcatcher". Visit'n Voices. Vermont Folklife Center. Archived from the original on 2008-06-13.
- All Music Guide. "Margaret MacArthur". Answers.com.
- "Margaret MacArthur: songs, family, traditions and country living". Encyclopedia.com.
- Kahn, Sharon (April 21, 2002). "My Harp Zither". Harp-O-Chord Zithers.
- "Margaret MacArthur". Smithsonian Folkways.
