= Hoover Creek =

River in the United States of America

Coordinates: 39.6342022°N 92.3421264°W

Hoover Creek is a stream in the U.S. state of Missouri. It is a tributary of the Middle Fork Salt River.

Hoover Creek most likely has the name of the local Hoover family.

== See also ==
- List of rivers of Missouri
