= Edwin R. Fellows =

American inventor & engineer (1865–1945)

- Born: May 29, 1865; Torrington, Connecticut, United States
- Died: May 21, 1945 (aged 79); Springfield, Vermont, United States
- Education: High school
- Engineering career
- Employer(s): Jones & Lamson Machine Company, Fellows Gear Shaper Company
- Significant design: Gear-cutting machine tool
- Significant advance: Gear shaper and cutter
- Awards: John Scott Medal of the Franklin Institute in 1899

Edwin R. Fellows (May 29, 1865 – May 21, 1945) was an American inventor and entrepreneur from Torrington, Connecticut who designed and built a new type of gear shaper in 1896 and, with the mentoring of James Hartness, left the Jones & Lamson Machine Company to co-found the Fellows Gear Shaper Company in Springfield, Vermont, which became one of the leading firms in the gear-cutting segment of the machine tool industry. Fellows' machines made a vital contribution to the mass production of effective and reliable gear transmissions for the nascent automotive industry. By the conclusion of World War II, Fellows Gear Shaper Company machines were in defense contractor plants, manufacturing geared components for aircraft engines, tanks, instruments, cameras, fuses and other war-time materiel.

== Early life ==
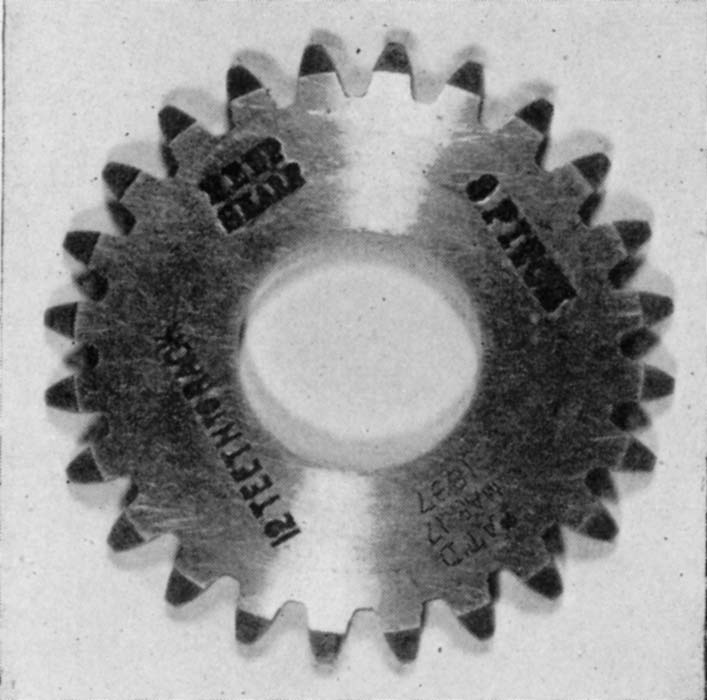
Early example of a Fellows gear cutter

Fellows' father, Charles L. Fellows, was a principal of Torrington High School and was interested in mathematics. When his father died, Fellows was in his first year of high school. As a result of his father's death, Fellows had to go to work as a department store clerk while his mother had to take on lodgers. One such lodger was James Hartness, who was to become a machine-tool entrepreneur in Springfield, Vermont and who befriended Fellows and ultimately convinced him to follow career opportunities in the Springfield machine-tool industry with his firm, the Jones & Lamson Machine Company (J&L). Roe reports that Fellows completed high school.

Fellows moved to Springfield in 1889, working first at a screw-making machine before being transferred to the drafting department at J&L. In this capacity he became interested in the problem of manufacturing gears, which requires accurate shaping according to mathematical principles in many different forms, including spur gears, worm gears, helical gears and spiral bevel gears. The problem employs the "study of involute cycloidal, epicycloidal and hypocycloidal curves."

By 1896 Fellows had fully developed a new approach to gear cutting. Previously, gears had been milled, using cutters that were formed to the shape of the individual teeth. Upon the completion of each gear tooth, the gear blank was indexed to a new position to mill the next tooth, which could lead to problems in accurate spacing of gear teeth and the shaping of the individual teeth. Fellows conceived a method whereby the gear cutter, which was itself a gear with hardened cutting edges, and gear blank revolved together as if they were a pair of gears. This process required no intermediate template or other type of mechanical guide for shaping the gear.

== Fellows Gear Shaper Company ==
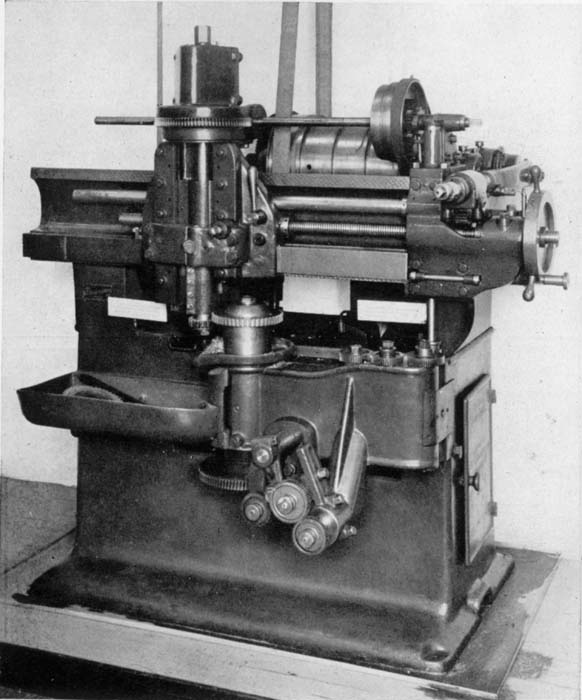
Original "6-Type" production Fellows gear shaper, ca. 1897.

=== Tools for the mass-production of gears ===
Fellows obtained backing from several Springfield industrialists, including Hartness and William D. Woolson, who founded the Fellows Gear Shaper Company on July 13, 1896. Fellows became manager of the company and Woolson the president. The company built a manufacturing facility in Springfield and ordered a prototype machine from Fitchburg Machine Works.

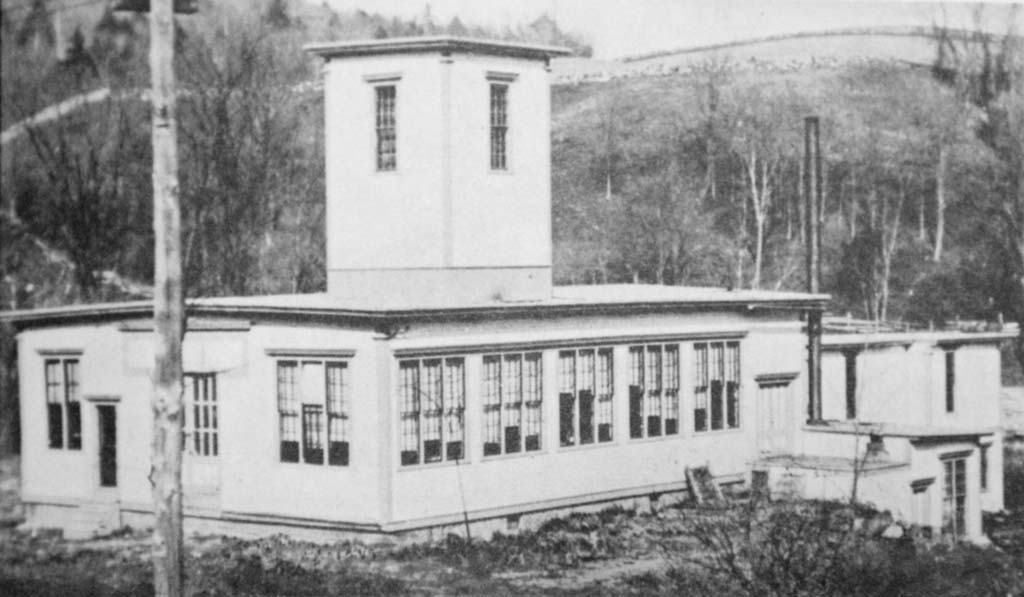
Original plant of the Fellows Gear Shaper Company in Springfield, Vermont, ca. 1897.

The first "6-Type" production machine was built in 1897 and sold to a Worcester, Massachusetts machine-tool firm. Sales were then slow until the advent of the mass-produced automobile. By 1911 the Fellows Gear Shaper Company was thriving with 37 percent of its production going to Europe. Fellows became president and general manager of the company in 1917. At this time the company had developed:

- A gear-generating machine, employing a reciprocating gear-like tool
- A self-locking index-wheel system with worm-drive to control the cutter and work in the gear-generating machine.
- A methodology for grinding involute curves in gears.
- A ground master gear.
- A gear-shaped planing tool for manufacturing helical gears.

By 1924 the Fellows Gear Shaper Company, under the direction of Fellows, employed seven hundred men and was capable of producing one hundred gear shapers and four thousand cutters per month. Roe characterized the company's gear shapers as "one of the most important tools in the manufacture of automobiles."

=== Tools for war-time production of gears ===
During World War II the Fellows Gear Shaper Company plant was enlarged to a peak work force of 3,300, including 400 women. The company's gear shaping machinery spanned extremes in capability between being able to produce gears with a 100-inch diameter to 1/16-inch diameter. By the conclusion of the war, Fellows Gear Shaper Company machines were in defense contractor plants manufacturing geared components, including:

- Airplane propeller shaft webs. (Special Disking Machines).
- Splines on aircraft engine crankshafts (Horizontal Z-Model).
- Helical gears for tank transmissions (No. 15B Gear Burnishing Machine).
- propeller gears for aircraft engines (No. 24 Hydro-Gear Lapper).
- Fine-pitch gears for aircraft instruments, aerial cameras, bomb fuses, etc. (Straight-Line Gear Generator).

Fellows resigned as general manager in 1939, but remained president and director of the company until his death in 1945. Fellows gear shapers continued to be manufactured and supported by Bourn & Koch, Inc. of Rockford, Illinois, as of 2022.

== Patents and awards ==
Fellows received 39 patents pertaining to gear shaping, generating, grinding and measuring machines. The Franklin Institute awarded him the John Scott Medal in 1899.

== Notes ==
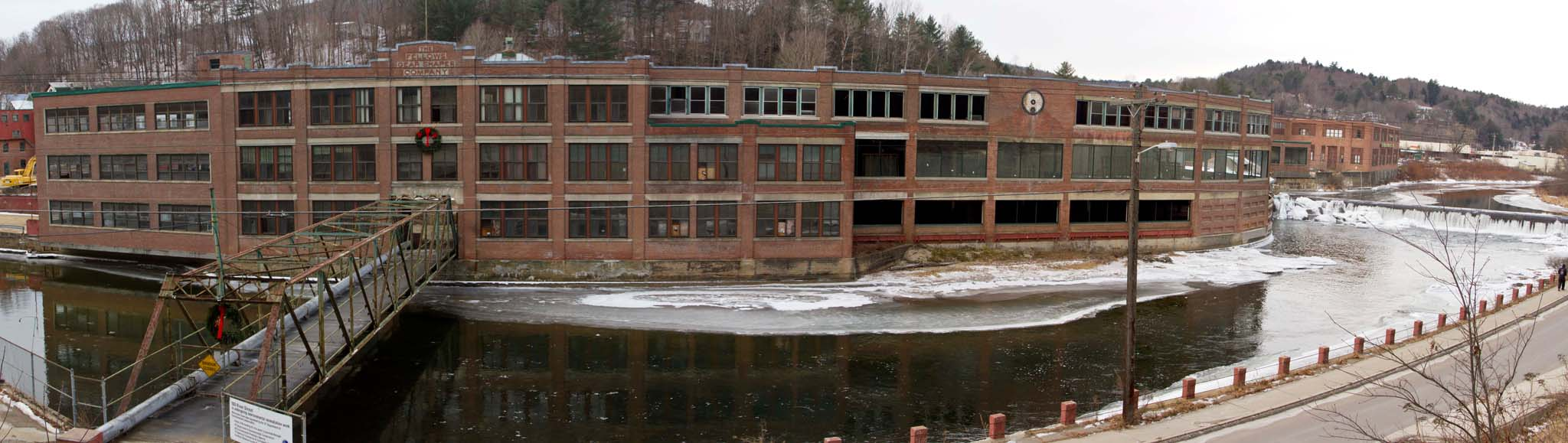
Former Fellows Gear Shaper Company manufacturing facility, used at the time of Fellows' death in 1945.

== Gallery ==
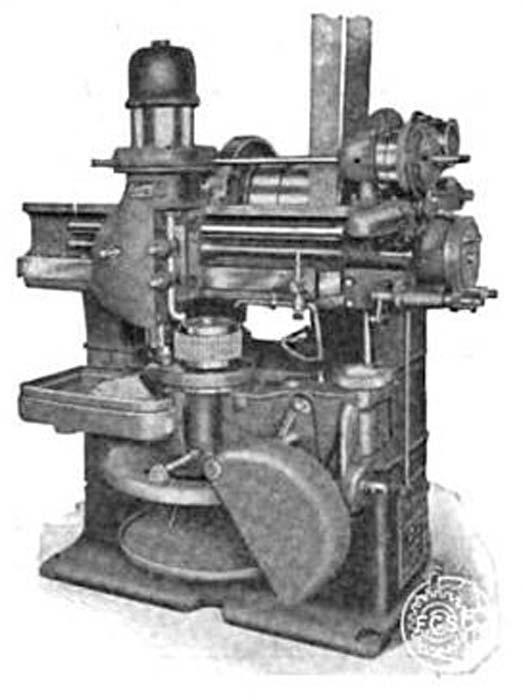
Fellows Gear Shaper Company "6-Type" spur gear shaper, ca. 1922.

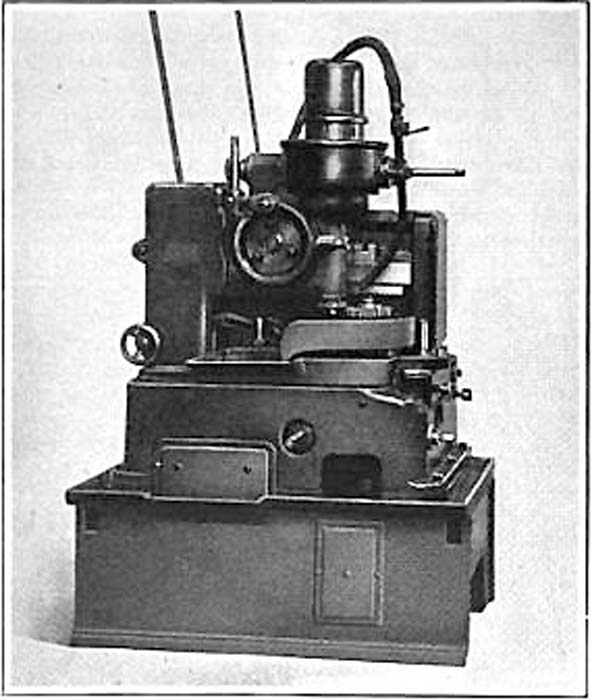
High-speed seven-inch spur gear shaper made by Fellows Gear Shaper Company, ca. 1922.

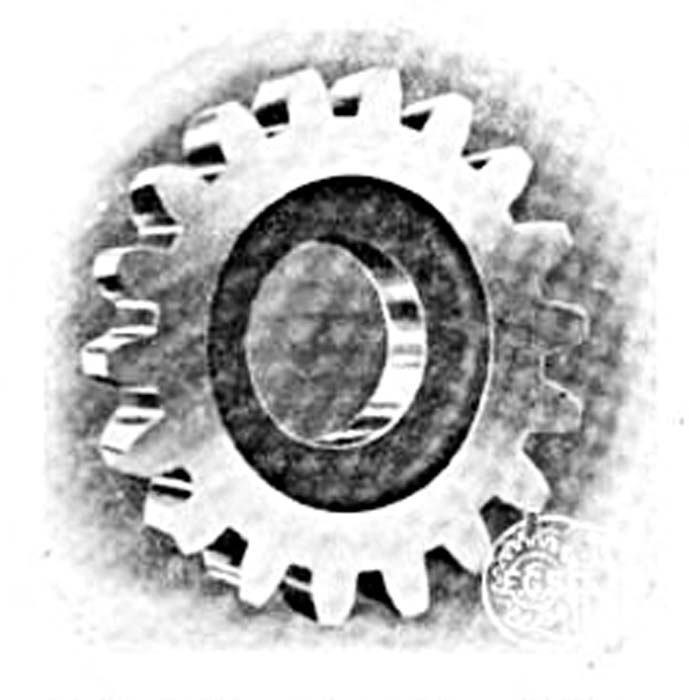
Fellows Gear Shaper Company spur gear cutter, ca. 1922.

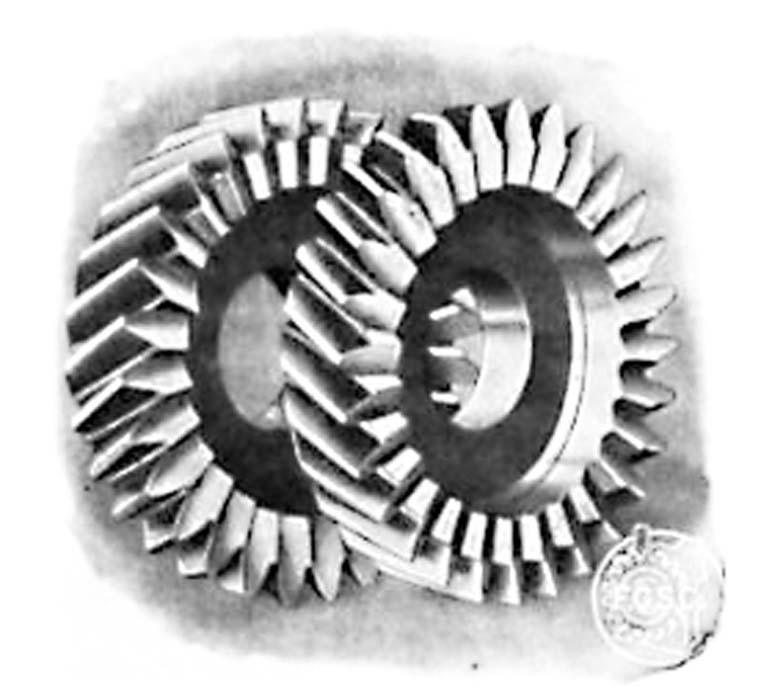
Right- and left-hand helical gear cutters by the Fellows Gear Shaper Company, ca. 1922.
