= Springfield, Vermont =

- Town
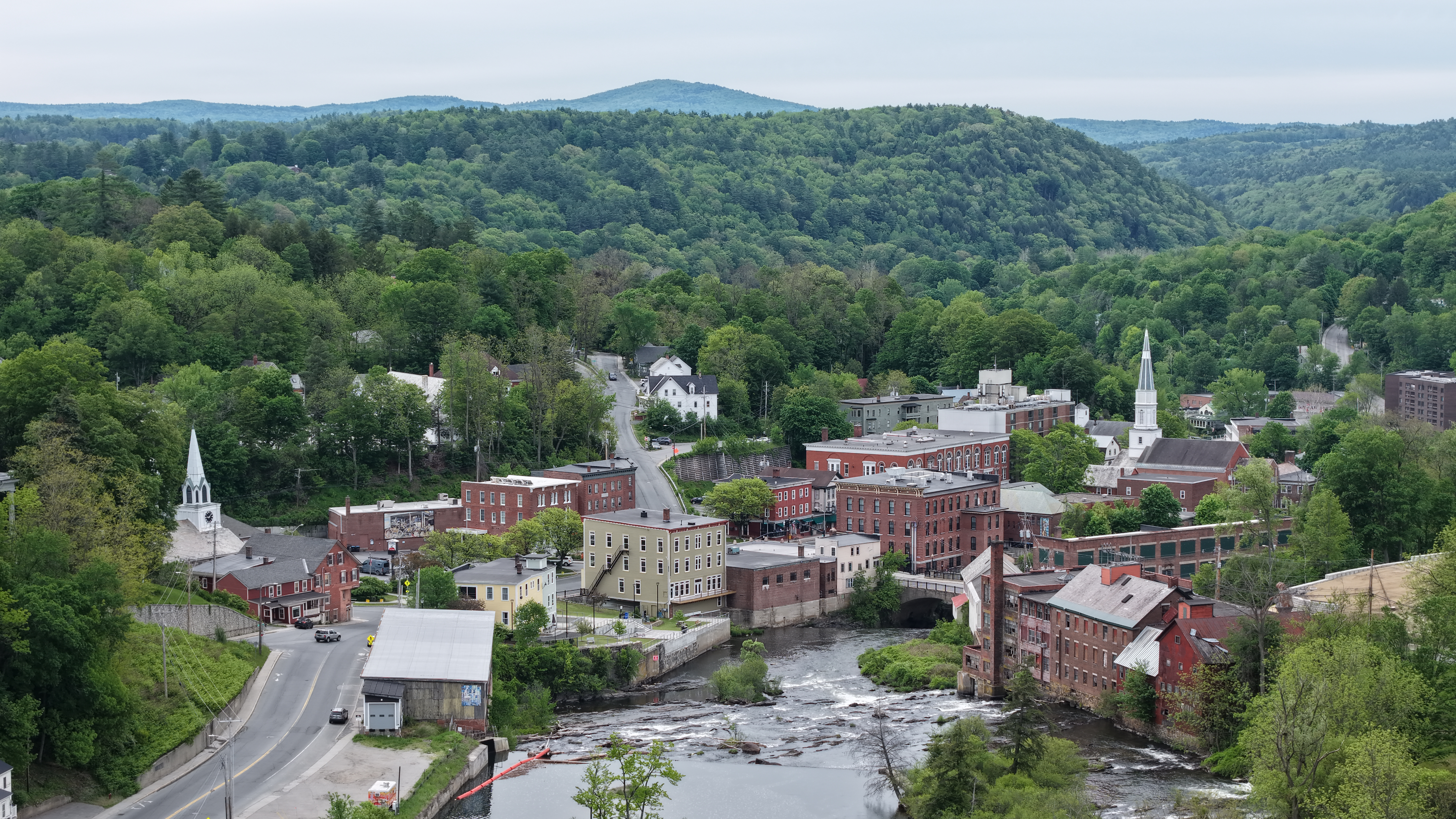
- Springfield, Vermont, from the northwest

- Flag Seal
- Motto: Progress Through Precision
- Location in Windsor County and the state of Vermont.
- Coordinates: 43°16′20″N 72°29′51″W
- Country: United States
- U.S. state: Vermont
- County: Windsor
- Chartered: August 19, 1761
- Communities: Springfield; Goulds Mill; Hardscrabble Corner; North Springfield; West Springfield

Area
  - Total: 49.5 sq mi (128.1 km^{2})
  - Land: 49.3 sq mi (127.7 km^{2})
  - Water: 0.15 sq mi (0.4 km^{2})
- Elevation: 528 ft (161 m)

Population (2020)
  - Total: 9,062
  - Density: 183.8/sq mi (70.96/km^{2})
- Time zone: UTC−5 (Eastern (EST))
  - Summer (DST): UTC−4 (EDT)
- ZIP Codes: 05156 (Springfield); 05150 (North Springfield); 05143 (Chester)
- Area code: 802
- FIPS code: 50-69550
- GNIS feature ID: 1462214
- Website: springfieldvt.gov

Springfield is a town in Windsor County, Vermont, United States. As of the 2020 census, the population was 9,062.

== History ==
One of the New Hampshire grants, the township was chartered on August 19, 1761, by Governor Benning Wentworth and awarded to Gideon Lyman and 61 others. Although Springfield's alluvial flats made it among the best agricultural towns in the state, the Black River falls, which drop 110 feet (34 m) in 1/8 of a mile (200 m), helped it develop into a mill town. Springfield was located in the center of the Precision Valley region, home of the Vermont machine tool industry.

In 1888, the Jones and Lamson Machine Tool Company (J&L) moved to Springfield from Windsor, Vermont under the successful leadership of James Hartness. Gaining international renown for precision and innovation, J&L ushered in a new era of precision manufacturing in the area. Edwin R. Fellows co-founded the Fellows Gear Shaper Company here in 1896. As knowledge and infrastructure grew to support precision machining, other companies such as the Bryant Chucking Grinder Company and Lovejoy Tool formed, grew, and provided much of the economic engine.

Springfield Telescope Makers, the oldest amateur telescope making club in the United States, has been based in Springfield since its inception in 1923 by Russell W. Porter. The club's pink clubhouse at the Stellafane Observatory was built in 1923 on Breezy Hill, just south of Springfield village, and has hosted an annual convention for astronomers and telescope makers nearly every summer since 1926. Many notable figures in the fields of astronomy and space exploration have attended the convention over the years.

During World War II, Springfield's production of machine tools was of such importance to the American war effort that the US government ranked Springfield (together with the Cone Automatic Machine Company of nearby Windsor) as the seventh most important bombing target in the country.

Springfield is also home to the Eureka Schoolhouse, the oldest one-room school in the state of Vermont. Completed in 1790, the building was in continuous use until 1900 and was restored in 1968 by the Vermont Board of Historic Sites. The school house was named by its first teacher, David Searle, who, after a long journey through the new frontier was heard to cry "Eureka!" upon reaching the new settlement of Springfield. The name stuck, and "Eureka" can still be found in street and business names throughout Springfield.

== Geography ==
According to the United States Census Bureau, the town has a total area of 49.5 square miles (128 km^{2}), of which 49.3 square miles (128 km^{2}) is land and 0.2 square miles (0.52 km^{2}) (0.30%) is water. Bounded on the east by the Connecticut River, Springfield is drained by the Black River, which flows directly through downtown. The town includes the village of North Springfield.

== Demographics ==
Historical population
Census	Pop.	Note	%±
1790	1,097		—
1800	2,032		85.2%
1810	2,556		25.8%
1820	2,702		5.7%
1830	2,749		1.7%
1840	2,625		−4.5%
1850	2,762		5.2%
1860	2,958		7.1%
1870	2,937		−0.7%
1880	3,144		7.0%
1890	2,881		−8.4%
1900	3,432		19.1%
1910	4,784		39.4%
1920	7,202		50.5%
1930	6,955		−3.4%
1940	7,720		11.0%
1950	9,190		19.0%
1960	9,934		8.1%
1970	10,063		1.3%
1980	10,190		1.3%
1990	9,579		−6.0%
2000	9,078		−5.2%
2010	9,373		3.2%
2020	9,062		−3.3%
U.S. Decennial Census

As of the census of 2000, there were 9,078 people, 3,886 households, and 2,498 families residing in the town. The population density was 184.1 people per square mile (71.1 people/km^{2}). There were 4,232 housing units at an average density of 85.8 per square mile (33.1/km^{2}). The racial makeup of the town was 97.60% White, 0.24% African American, 0.14% Native American, 0.77% Asian, 0.06% Pacific Islander, 0.18% from other races, and 1.01% from two or more races. Hispanic or Latino of any race were 0.72% of the population.

There were 3,886 households, out of which 28.5% had children under the age of 18 living with them, 49.9% were married couples living together, 10.2% had a female householder with no husband present, and 35.7% were non-families. 30.5% of all households were made up of individuals, and 15.1% had someone living alone who was 65 years of age or older. The average household size was 2.31 and the average family size was 2.84.

In the town, the population was spread out, with 23.3% under the age of 18, 6.4% from 18 to 24, 25.9% from 25 to 44, 25.4% from 45 to 64, and 19.0% who were 65 years of age or older. The median age was 42 years. For every 100 females, there were 91.0 males. For every 100 females age 18 and over, there were 87.9 males.

The median income for a household in the town was $34,169, and the median income for a family was $42,620. Males had a median income of $31,931 versus $23,019 for females. The per capita income for the town was $18,452. About 8.3% of families and 9.8% of the population were below the poverty line, including 10.3% of those under age 18 and 11.4% of those age 65 or over.

== Arts and culture ==
Several sites in Springfield, including the historic downtown area, have historical significance and are listed on the National Register of Historic Places (NRHP). Cultural and historic sites include:

- Eureka Schoolhouse (1790)
- Hartness Mansion (1903–1904) (NRHP)
- Springfield Art and Historical Society
- The Stellafane National Historic Landmark
- Gould's Mill Bridge, a steel truss bridge (NRHP).

== Education ==
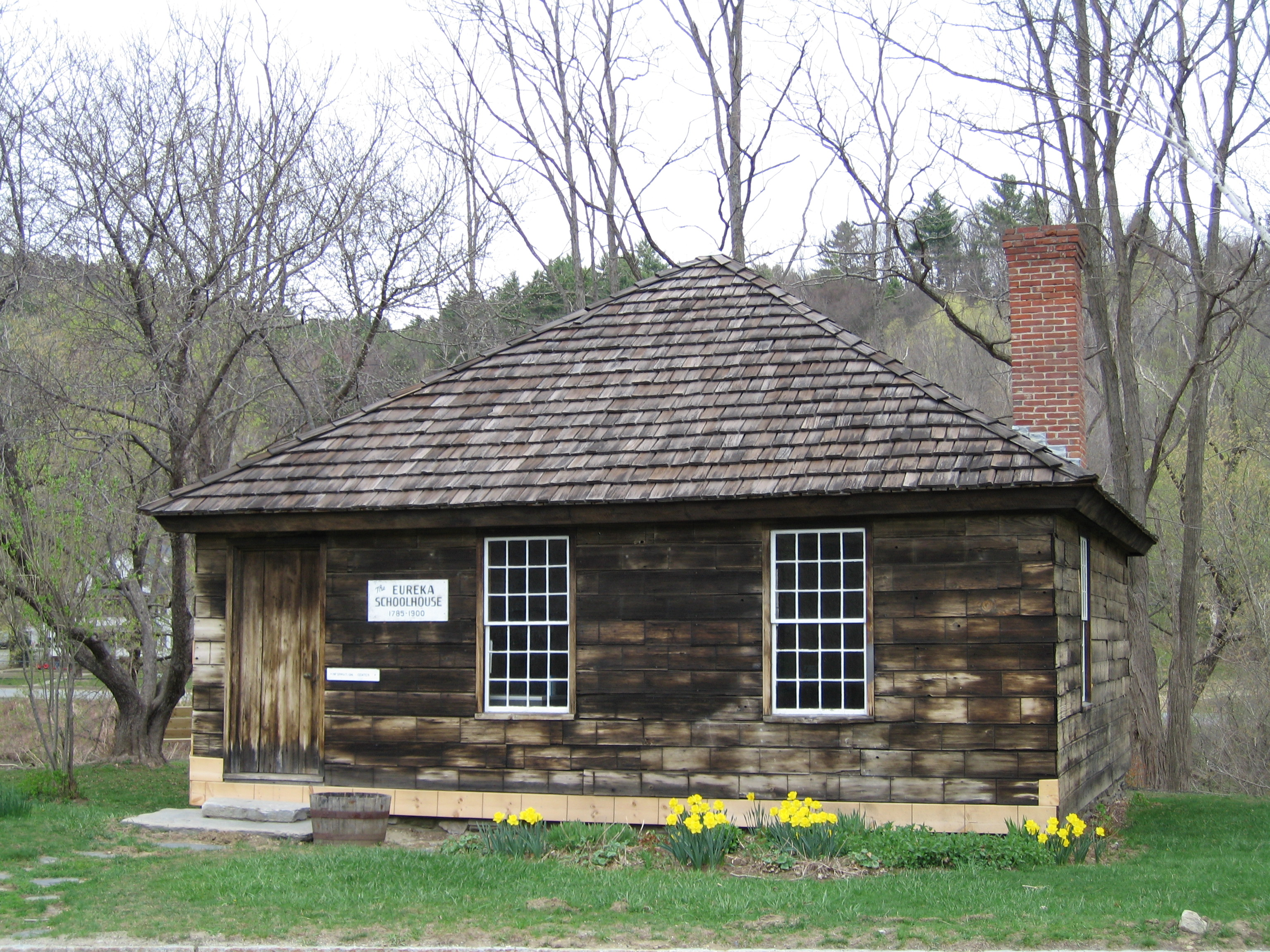
Eureka Schoolhouse (1790), Vermont's oldest one-room school

Springfield's public school system is overseen by a five-member school board elected individually by staggered elections to three year terms. Schools include:

- Elm Hill Elementary
- Union Street Elementary
- Riverside Middle School
- Springfield High School

=== Colleges ===
Satellite campuses of the Community College of Vermont and the University of Vermont are located in Springfield, as well as River Valley Technical Center, a regional technical college.

The Black River Innovation Campus is offers co-working space, entrepreneurship programs, STEAM education, and technology resources.

== Media ==
Springfield is home to its own TV station known as SAPA TV. It broadcasts local info, as well as interviews with local bands, business owners, etc.

== Infrastructure ==
=== Health care ===
The Springfield Hospital is located in Springfield.

=== Transportation ===
Springfield is intersected by Interstate 91, U.S. Route 5 and Vermont routes 10, 11, 106 and 143. Connecticut River Transit provides bus service.

== Notable people ==
- Daric Barton, first baseman with the Oakland Athletics
- George B. Burrows, Wisconsin state legislator
- Henry W. Closson, U.S. Army brigadier general
- George M. Darrow, foremost American authority on strawberries
- Edwin R. Fellows, machine-tool inventor, industrialist
- Walbridge A. Field, U.S. Representative
- Helen Hartness Flanders, collector of American folk music
- Ralph Flanders, machine-tool entrepreneur, banker, senator
- John Elliot Goodenow, politician in Iowa
- Albert Lovejoy Gutterson, Olympic gold medalist (long jump)
- James Hartness, inventor, aviator and 58th governor of Vermont
- Dudley C. Haskell, U.S. Representative
- Charles B. Hoard, U.S. Representative
- Bill Jackowski, professional baseball umpire
- Joseph B. Johnson, 70th governor of Vermont
- Kenny Johnson, film and television actor
- Pattrice Jones, ecofeminist writer, educator, and activist
- James Kochalka, local cartoonist and rock musician
- Lewis R. Morris, U.S. Representative
- Levi P. Morton, 22nd Vice President of the United States
- Alban J. Parker, Vermont Attorney General
- Samuel B. Pettengill, U.S. Representative
- Russell W. Porter, explorer, artist and telescope innovator
- Asahel Lynde Powers, painter
- Paul W. Ruse Jr., Vermont State Treasurer
- Edwin W. Stoughton, lawyer and diplomat
- James Bates Thomson, mathematician, educator, and author
- Wheelock G. Veazey, attorney, judge, and government official
- Louis G. Whitcomb, United States Attorney for Vermont

== In popular culture ==
On July 10, 2007, Springfield was selected to host the premiere of The Simpsons Movie, which, like the Simpsons TV show, is set in a town called Springfield. In a Fox competition, Vermont was chosen to host the opening for over 13 other places around the nation called Springfield.
