= Isidor Rabi =

American physicist (1898–1988)

- איזידאָר ראַבי
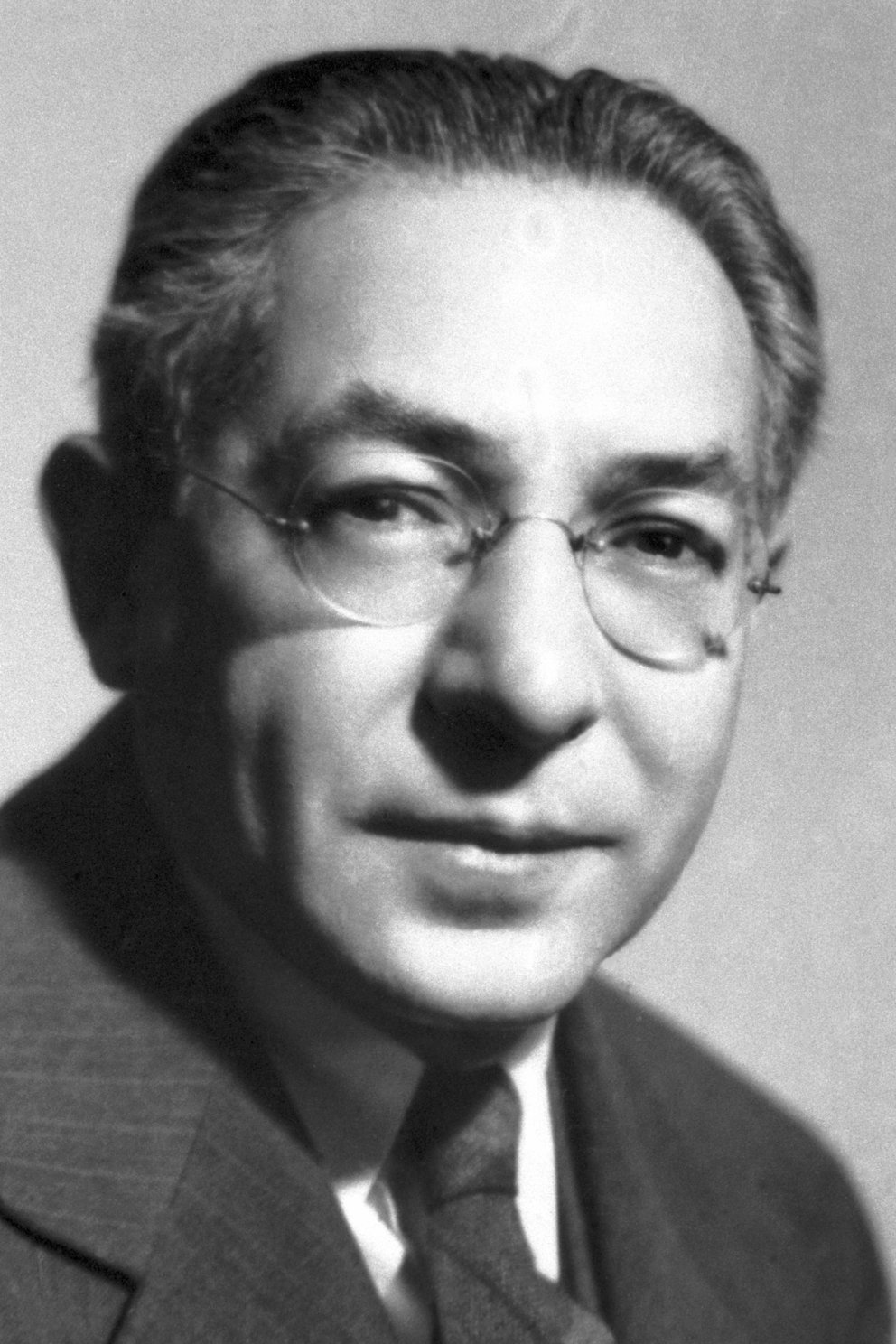
- Rabi in 1944
- Born: Israel Isaac Rabi; July 29, 1898; Rymanów, Austria-Hungary
- Died: January 11, 1988 (aged 89); New York City, U.S.
- Resting place: Riverside Cemetery
- Education: Cornell University (grad. 1919); Columbia University (grad. 1927)
- Known for: Nuclear magnetic resonance; Breit–Rabi formula
- Spouse: Helen Newmark (m. 1926)
- Children: 2
- Awards: See list: Newcomb Cleveland Prize (1939); Elliott Cresson Medal (1942); Nobel Prize in Physics (1944); Medal for Merit (1948); King's Medal for Service in the Cause of Freedom (1948); Barnard Medal for Meritorious Service to Science (1960); Atoms for Peace Award (1967); Oersted Medal (1982); Public Welfare Medal (1985); Vannevar Bush Award (1986)
- Scientific career
- Fields: Physics
- Workplaces: Columbia University
- Thesis: On the principal magnetic susceptibilities of crystals (1927)
- Doctoral advisor: Albert Potter Wills
- Doctoral students: Vernon W. Hughes; Lloyd Motz; Martin Lewis Perl; Norman Ramsey; Julian Schwinger; Herbert Zeiger
- Other notable students: Arthur Kantrowitz; Robert Ledley; William Nierenberg

Signature
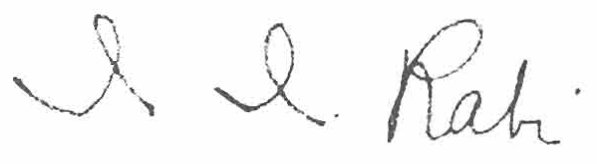

Israel Isaac "Isidor" Rabi (/ˈrɑːbi/; Yiddish: איזידאָר יצחק ראַבי, romanized: Izidor Yitzkhok Rabi; July 29, 1898 – January 11, 1988) was an American physicist who received the Nobel Prize in Physics in 1944 "for his resonance method for recording the magnetic properties of atomic nuclei." He was also one of the first scientists in the United States to work on the cavity magnetron, which is used in microwave radar and microwave ovens.

Born into a traditional Polish-Jewish family in Rymanów, Austria-Hungary, Rabi came to the United States as an infant and was raised in New York's Lower East Side. He entered Cornell University as an electrical engineering student in 1916, but soon switched to chemistry. Later, he became interested in physics. He continued his studies at Columbia University, where he was awarded his doctorate for a thesis on the magnetic susceptibility of certain crystals. In 1927, he headed for Europe, where he met and worked with many of the finest physicists of the time.

In 1929, Rabi returned to the United States, where Columbia offered him a faculty position. In collaboration with Gregory Breit, he developed the Breit–Rabi equation and predicted that the Stern–Gerlach experiment could be modified to confirm the properties of the atomic nucleus. His techniques for using nuclear magnetic resonance to discern the magnetic moment and nuclear spin of atoms earned him the Nobel Prize in Physics in 1944. Nuclear magnetic resonance became an important tool for nuclear physics and chemistry, and the subsequent development of magnetic resonance imaging (MRI) from it has also made it important to the field of medicine.

During World War II he worked on radar at the Massachusetts Institute of Technology (MIT) Radiation Laboratory and on the Manhattan Project. After the war, he served on the General Advisory Committee (GAC) of the Atomic Energy Commission, and was chairman from 1952 to 1956. He also served on the Science Advisory Committees (SACs) of the Office of Defense Mobilization and the Army's Ballistic Research Laboratory, and was Science Advisor to President Dwight D. Eisenhower. He was involved with the establishment of the Brookhaven National Laboratory in 1946, and later, as United States delegate to UNESCO, with the creation of CERN in 1952. When Columbia created the rank of university professor in 1964, Rabi was the first to receive that position. A special chair was named after him in 1985. He retired from teaching in 1967, but remained active in the department and held the title of University Professor Emeritus and Special Lecturer until his death.

== Early life and education ==
Israel Isaac Rabi was born on July 29, 1898, in Rymanów, Galicia, into a Polish Orthodox Jewish family. The following year, his family emigrated to the United States and moved into a two-room apartment on the Lower East Side of Manhattan. At home the family spoke Yiddish. When Rabi was enrolled in school, his mother said his name was Izzy, and a school official, thinking it was short for Isidor, put that down as his name. Henceforth, that became his official name. Later, in response to anti-Semitism, he started writing his name as Isidor Isaac Rabi, and was known professionally as I. I. Rabi. To most of his friends and family, including his sister Gertrude, who was born in 1903, he was known simply by his last name. In 1907, the family moved to Brownsville, Brooklyn, where they ran a grocery store.

As a boy, Rabi was interested in science. He read science books borrowed from the public library and built his own radio set. His first scientific paper—written on the design of a radio condenser—was published in Modern Electrics when he was in elementary school. After reading about Copernican heliocentrism, he became an atheist. "It's all very simple", he told his parents, adding, "Who needs God?" As a compromise with his parents, for his Bar Mitzvah, which was held at home, he gave a speech in Yiddish about how an electric light works. He attended the Manual Training High School in Brooklyn, from which he graduated in 1916. Later that year, he entered Cornell University as an electrical engineering student, but soon switched to chemistry. After the American entry into World War I in 1917, he joined the Student Army Training Corps at Cornell. For his senior thesis, he investigated the oxidation states of manganese. He was awarded his bachelor's degree in June 1919, but since at the time Jews were largely excluded from employment in the chemical industry and academia, he did not receive any job offers. He worked briefly at the Lederle Laboratories, and then as a bookkeeper.

In 1922 Rabi returned to Cornell as a graduate chemistry student, and began studying physics. In 1923 he met, and began courting, Helen Newmark, a summer-semester student at Hunter College. To be near her when she returned home, he continued his studies at Columbia University, where his supervisor was Albert Wills. In June 1924 Rabi landed a job as a part-time tutor at the City College of New York. Wills, whose specialty was magnetism, suggested that Rabi write his doctoral thesis on the magnetic susceptibility of sodium vapor. The topic did not appeal to Rabi, but after William Lawrence Bragg gave a seminar at Columbia about the electric susceptibility of certain crystals called Tutton's salts, Rabi decided to research their magnetic susceptibility, and Wills agreed to be his supervisor.

Measuring the magnetic resonance of crystals first involved growing the crystals, a simple procedure often done by elementary school students. The crystals then had to be prepared by skillfully cutting them into sections with facets that had an orientation different from the internal structure of the crystal, and the response to a magnetic field had to be painstakingly measured. While his crystals were growing, Rabi read James Clerk Maxwell's 1873 A Treatise on Electricity and Magnetism, which inspired an easier method. He lowered a crystal on a glass fiber attached to a torsion balance into a solution whose magnetic susceptibility could be varied between two magnetic poles. When it matched that of the crystal, the magnet could be turned on and off without disturbing the crystal. The new method not only required much less work, it also produced a more accurate result. Rabi sent his thesis, titled On the Principal Magnetic Susceptibilities of Crystals, to Physical Review on July 16, 1926. He married Helen the next day. The paper attracted little fanfare in academic circles, although it was read by Kariamanickam Srinivasa Krishnan, who used the method in his own investigations of crystals. Rabi concluded that he needed to promote his work as well as publish it.

Like many other young physicists, Rabi was closely following momentous events in Europe. He was astounded by the Stern–Gerlach experiment, which convinced him of the validity of quantum mechanics. With Ralph Kronig, Francis Bitter, Mark Zemansky and others, he set out to extend the Schrödinger equation to symmetric top molecules and find the energy states of such a mechanical system. The problem was that none of them could solve the resulting equation, a second-order partial differential equation. Rabi found the answer in Ludwig Schlesinger's Einführung in die Theorie der Differentialgleichungen (Introduction to the theory of differential equations), which describes a method originally developed by Carl Gustav Jacob Jacobi. The equation had the form of a hypergeometric equation to which Jacobi had found a solution. Kronig and Rabi wrote up their result and sent it to Physical Review, which published it in 1927.

== Studies in Europe ==
In May 1927, Rabi was appointed a Barnard Fellow. This came with a stipend of $1,500 ($28,000 in 2025 dollars) for the period from September 1927 to June 1928. He immediately applied for a year's leave of absence from the City College of New York so he could study in Europe. When this was refused, he resigned. On reaching Zürich, where he hoped to work for Erwin Schrödinger, he met two fellow Americans, Julius Adams Stratton and Linus Pauling. They found that Schrödinger was leaving, as he had been appointed head of the Theoretical Institute at the Friedrich Wilhelm University of Berlin. Rabi therefore decided to seek a position with Arnold Sommerfeld at the Ludwig-Maximilians-Universität München instead. There in Munich, he found two more Americans, Howard Percy Robertson and Edward Condon. Sommerfeld accepted Rabi as a postdoctoral researcher. German physicists Rudolf Peierls and Hans Bethe were also working with Sommerfeld at the time, but the three Americans became especially close.

On Wills' advice, Rabi traveled to Leeds for the 97th annual meeting of the British Association for the Advancement of Science, where he heard Werner Heisenberg present a paper on quantum mechanics. Afterwards, Rabi moved to Copenhagen, where he volunteered to work for Niels Bohr. Bohr was on vacation, but Rabi went straight to work on calculating the magnetic susceptibility of molecular hydrogen. After Bohr returned in October, he arranged for Rabi and Yoshio Nishina to continue their work with Wolfgang Pauli at the University of Hamburg.

Although he came to Hamburg to work with Pauli, Rabi found Otto Stern working there with two English-speaking postdoctoral fellows, Ronald Fraser and John Bradshaw Taylor. Rabi soon made friends with them, and became interested in their molecular beam experiments, for which Stern would receive the Nobel Prize in Physics in 1943. Their research involved non-uniform magnetic fields, which were difficult to manipulate and hard to measure accurately. Rabi devised a method of using a uniform field instead, with the molecular beam at a glancing angle, so the atoms would be deflected like light through a prism. This would be easier to use, and produce more accurate results. Encouraged by Stern, and greatly assisted by Taylor, Rabi managed to get his idea to work. On Stern's advice, Rabi wrote a letter about his results to Nature, which published it in February 1929, followed by a paper entitled Zur Methode der Ablenkung von Molekularstrahlen ("On the method of deflection of molecular beams") to Zeitschrift für ("Journal of Physics"), where it was published in April.

By this time the Barnard Fellowship had expired, and Rabi and Helen were living on a $182 ($3,400 in 2025 dollars) per month stipend from the Rockefeller Foundation. They left Hamburg for Leipzig, where he hoped to work with Heisenberg. In Leipzig, he found Robert Oppenheimer, a fellow New Yorker. It would be the start of a long friendship. Heisenberg departed for a tour of the United States in March 1929, so Rabi and Oppenheimer decided to go to the ETH Zurich, where Pauli was now the professor of physics. Rabi's education in physics was enriched by the leaders in the field he met there, which included Paul Dirac, Walter Heitler, Fritz London, Francis Wheeler Loomis, John von Neumann, John Slater, Leó Szilárd and Eugene Wigner.

== Molecular Beam Laboratory ==
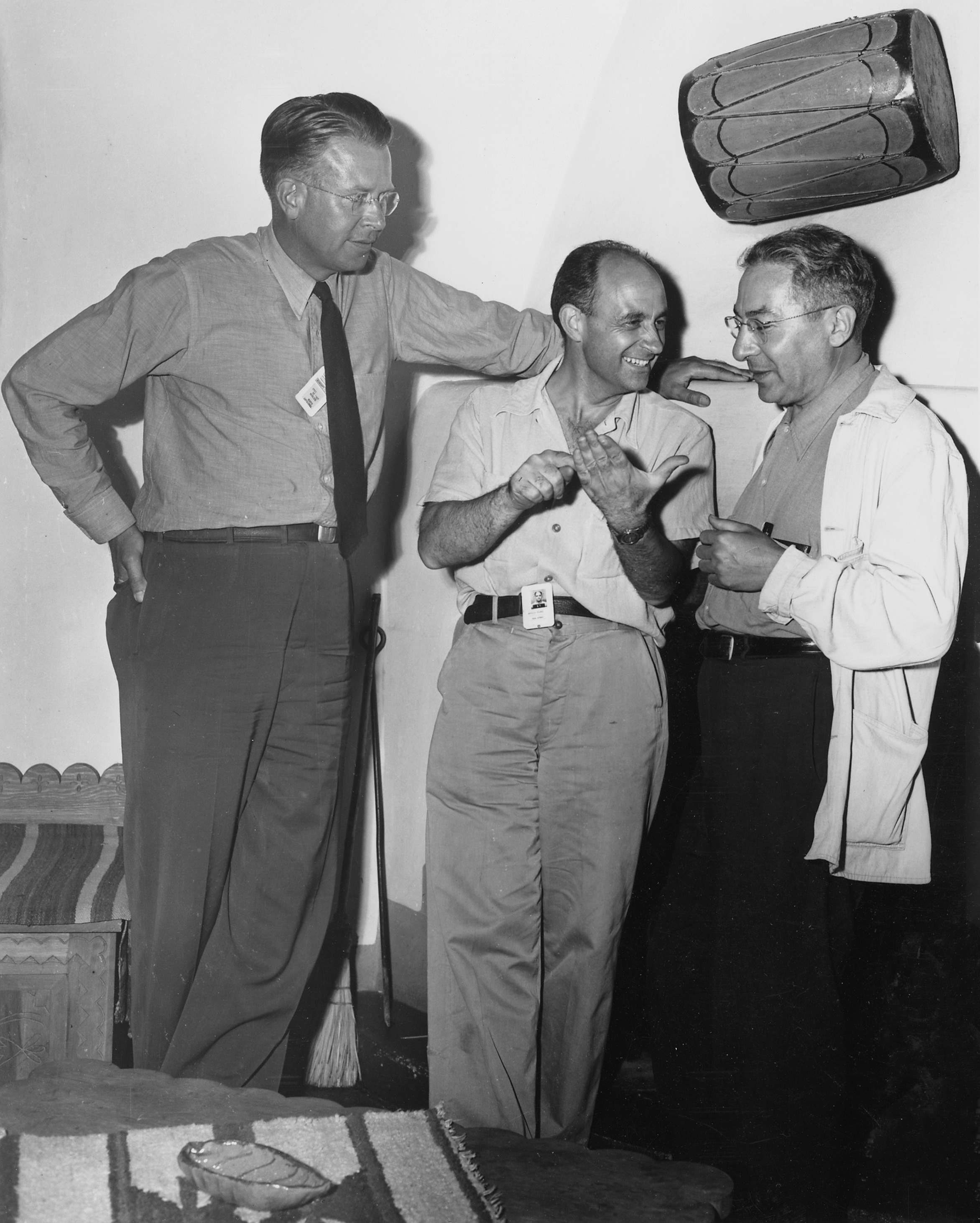
Rabi (right) with fellow Nobel Prize laureates Ernest O. Lawrence and Enrico Fermi

On March 26, 1929, Rabi received an offer of a lectureship from Columbia, with an annual salary of $3,000. The dean of Columbia's physics department, George B. Pegram, was looking for a theoretical physicist to teach statistical mechanics and an advanced course in the new subject of quantum mechanics, and Heisenberg had recommended Rabi. Helen was now pregnant, so Rabi needed a regular job, and this job was in New York. He accepted, and returned to the United States in August on the SS President Roosevelt. Rabi became the only Jewish faculty member at Columbia at the time.

Rabi was a poor instructor. Leon Lederman recalled that after a lecture, students would head to the library to try to work out what Rabi had been talking about. Irving Kaplan rated Rabi and Harold Urey as "the worst teachers I ever had". Norman Ramsey considered Rabi's lectures "pretty dreadful", while William Nierenberg felt that he was "simply an awful lecturer". Despite his shortcomings as a lecturer, his influence was great. He inspired many of his students to pursue careers in physics, and some became famous.

Rabi's first daughter, Helen Elizabeth, was born in September 1929. A second girl, Margaret Joella, followed in 1934. Between his teaching duties and his family, he had little time for research, and published no papers in his first year at Columbia, but was nonetheless promoted to assistant professor at its conclusion. He became a professor in 1937.

In 1931 Rabi returned to particle beam experiments. In collaboration with Gregory Breit, he developed the Breit-Rabi equation, and predicted that the Stern–Gerlach experiment could be modified to confirm the properties of the atomic nucleus. The next step was to do so. With the help of Victor W. Cohen, Rabi built a molecular beam apparatus at Columbia. Their idea was to employ a weak magnetic field instead of a strong one, with which they hoped to detect the nuclear spin of sodium. When the experiment was conducted, four beamlets were found, from which they deduced a nuclear spin of 3/2.

Rabi's Molecular Beam Laboratory began to attract others, including Sidney Millman, a graduate student who studied lithium for his doctorate. Another was Jerrold Zacharias who, believing that the sodium nucleus would be too difficult to understand, proposed studying the simplest of the elements, hydrogen. Its deuterium isotope had only recently been discovered at Columbia in 1931 by Urey, who received the 1934 Nobel Prize in Chemistry for this work. Urey was able to supply them with both heavy water and gaseous deuterium for their experiments. Despite its simplicity, Stern's group in Hamburg had observed that hydrogen did not behave as predicted. Urey also helped in another way; he gave Rabi half his prize money to fund the Molecular Beam Laboratory. Other scientists whose careers began at the Molecular Beam Laboratory included Norman Ramsey, Julian Schwinger, Jerome Kellogg and Polykarp Kusch. All were men; Rabi did not believe that women could be physicists. He never had a woman as a doctoral or postdoctoral student, and generally opposed women as candidates for faculty positions.

At the suggestion of C. J. Gorter, the team attempted to use an oscillating field. This became the basis for the nuclear magnetic resonance method. In 1937, Rabi, Kusch, Millman and Zacharias used it to measure the magnetic moment of several lithium compounds with molecular beams, including lithium chloride, lithium fluoride and dilithium. Applying the method to hydrogen, they found that the moment of a proton was 2.785±0.02 nuclear magnetons, and not 1 as predicted by the then-current theory, while that of a deuteron was 0.855±0.006 nuclear magnetons. This provided more accurate measurements of what Stern's team had found, and Rabi's team had confirmed, in 1934. Since a deuteron is composed of a proton and a neutron with aligned spins, the neutron's magnetic moment could be inferred by subtracting the proton's magnetic moment from the deuteron's. The resulting value was not zero, and had a sign opposite to that of the proton. Based on curious artifacts of these more accurate measurements, Rabi suggested that the deuteron had an electric quadrupole moment. This discovery meant that the physical shape of the deuteron was not symmetric, which provided valuable insight into the nature of the nuclear force binding nucleons. For the creation of the molecular-beam magnetic-resonance detection method, Rabi was awarded the Nobel Prize in Physics in 1944.

== World War II ==
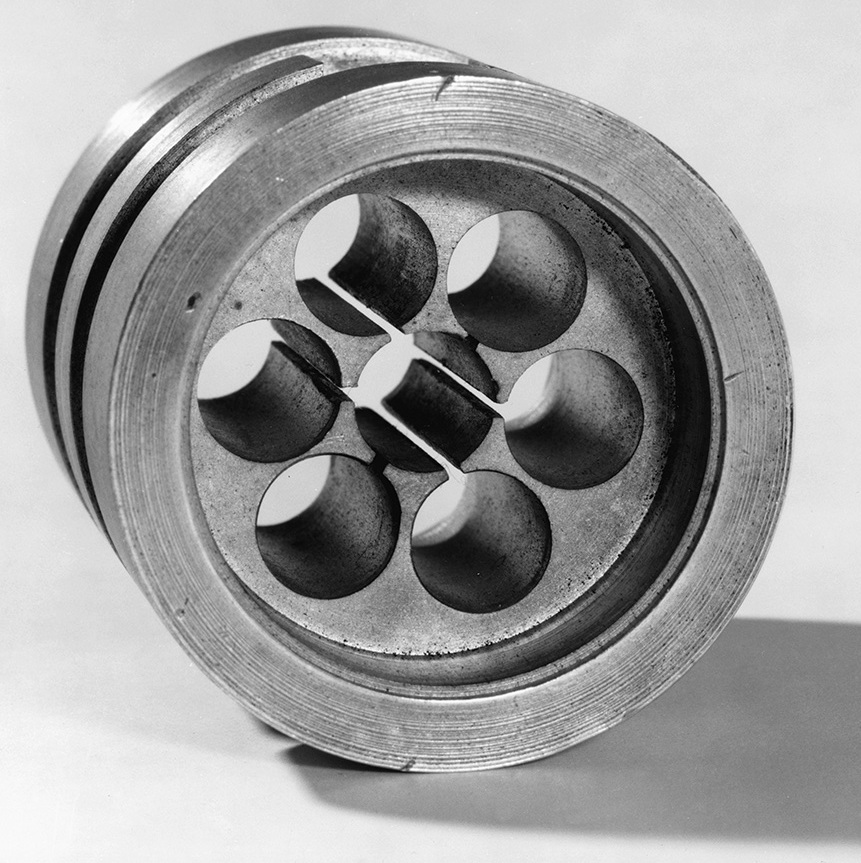
Anode block of an original cavity magnetron, showing the resonant cavities, developed by John Randall and Harry Boot at the University of Birmingham

In September 1940, Rabi became a member of the Scientific Advisory Committee of the U.S. Army's Ballistic Research Laboratory. That month, the British Tizard Mission brought a number of new technologies to the United States, including a cavity magnetron, a high-powered device that generates microwaves using the interaction of a stream of electrons with a magnetic field. This device promised to revolutionize radar, so Alfred Lee Loomis of the National Defense Research Committee (NDRC) decided to establish a new laboratory at the Massachusetts Institute of Technology (MIT) to develop this radar technology. The name Radiation Laboratory was chosen as both unremarkable and a tribute to the Berkeley Radiation Laboratory. Loomis recruited Lee DuBridge to run it.

Rabi's group made early progress improving the magnetron's power output, and he soon formed an Advance Development Group under Ramsey to build an experimental radar system at the shorter wavelength of 3 cm. By mid-May 1941 this system, the first to use a waveguide, was returning echoes from ground objects six miles away. When the laboratory was reorganized into formal divisions in March 1942, Rabi became associate director and head of Division 4 (Research), with responsibility for the laboratory's scientific program. Beyond his divisional role, Rabi functioned as a roving consultant whom any staff member could approach with problems.

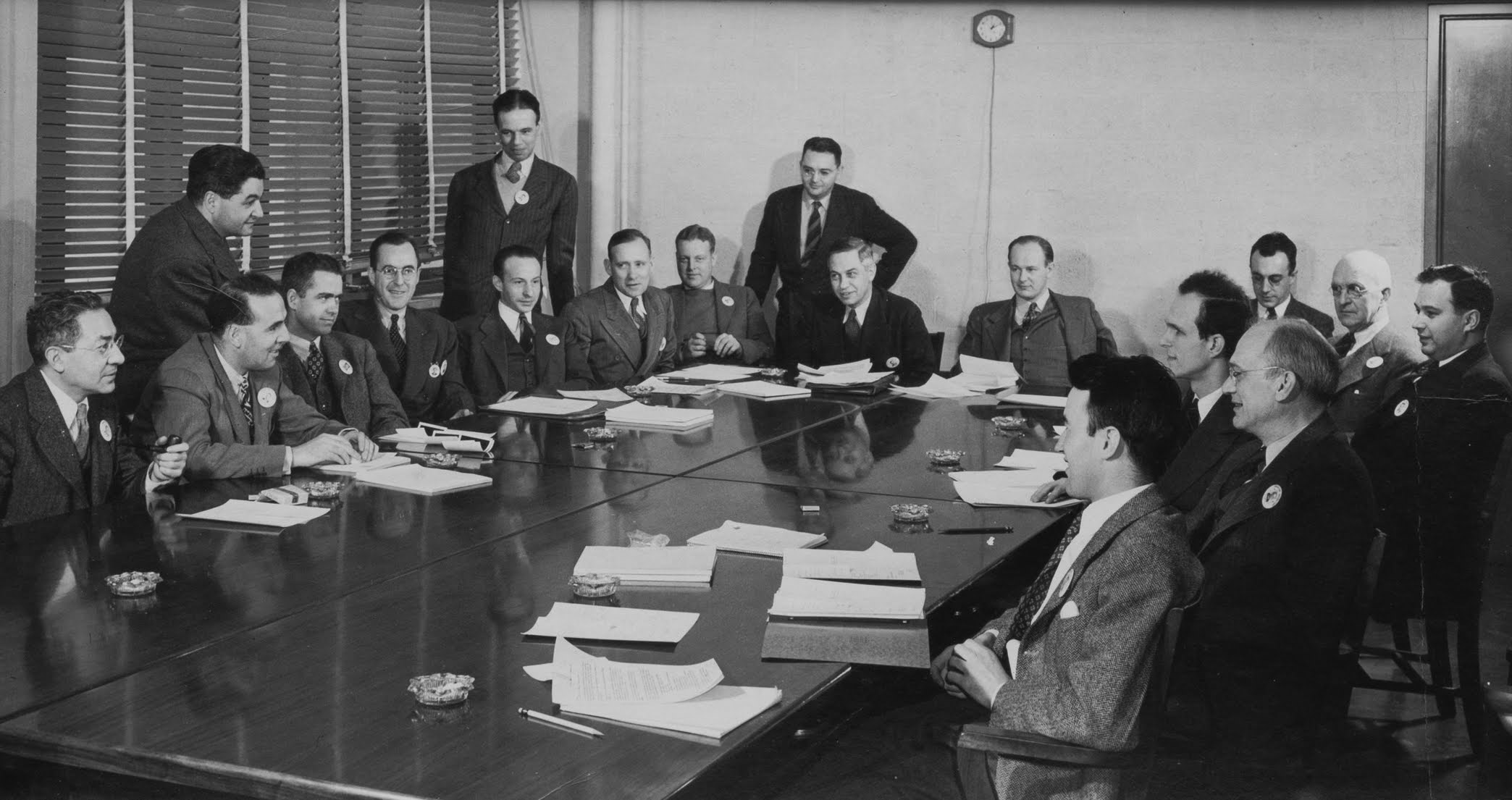
Rabi, at left, in the Rad Lab Steering Committee

In early 1942, Rabi proposed establishing a satellite laboratory at Columbia University to develop magnetrons at still shorter wavelengths. The MIT magnetron group was overburdened, and the New York location offered proximity to Bell Labs while allowing him to recruit colleagues whose personal circumstances kept them in the city, including Jerome M. B. Kellogg and Polykarp Kusch. The Columbia Radiation Laboratory began operations in March 1942 under a $140,000 NDRC contract, with Rabi as nonresident director. The three-centimeter magnetron work that Rabi's groups had initiated at MIT proved foundational to several of the war's most important radar systems, including H_{2}X airborne bombing radars and high-resolution shipboard sets.

In 1942, Robert Oppenheimer attempted to recruit Rabi and Robert Bacher to work at the Los Alamos Laboratory on a new secret project. They convinced Oppenheimer that his plan for a military laboratory would not work, since a scientific effort would need to be a civilian affair. The plan was modified, and the new laboratory would be a civilian one, run by the University of California under contract from the War Department. In the end, Rabi still did not go west, but did agree to serve as a consultant to the Manhattan Project. Rabi attended the Trinity test in July 1945. The scientists working on Trinity set up a betting pool on the yield of the test, with predictions ranging from total dud to 45 kilotons of TNT equivalent (kt). Rabi arrived late and found the only entry left was for 18 kilotons, which he purchased. Wearing welding goggles, he waited for the result with Ramsey and Enrico Fermi. The blast was rated at 18.6 kilotons, and Rabi won the pool.

== Later life ==
In 1945, Rabi delivered the Richtmyer Memorial Lecture, held by the American Association of Physics Teachers in honor of Floyd K. Richtmyer, wherein he proposed that the magnetic resonance of atoms might be used as the basis of a clock. William L. Laurence wrote it up for The New York Times, under the headline "'Cosmic pendulum' for clock planned". Before long Zacharias and Ramsey had built such atomic clocks. Rabi actively pursued his research into magnetic resonance until about 1960, but he continued to make appearances at conferences and seminars until his death.

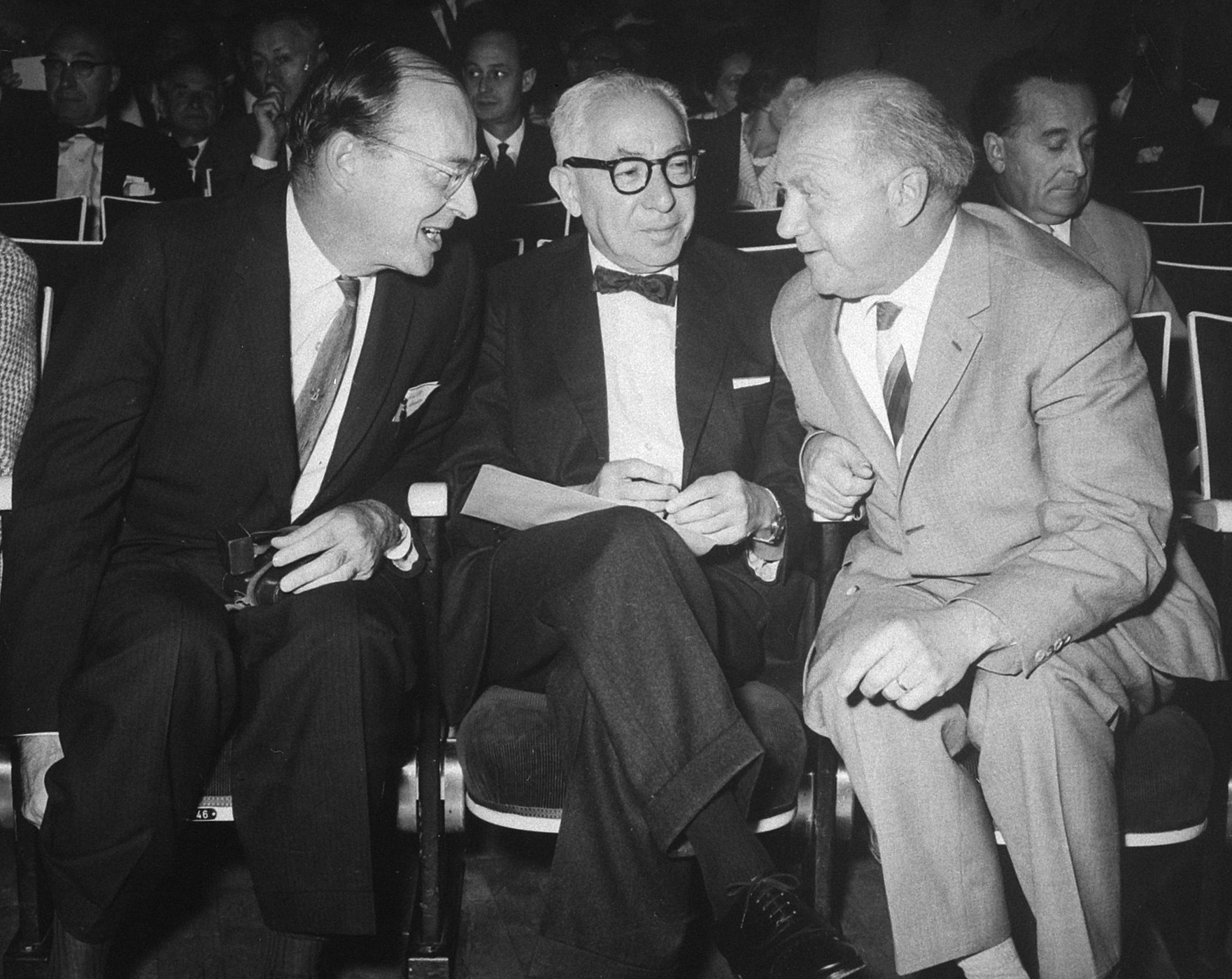
Rabi with fellow Nobel Prize laureates John Bardeen (left) and Werner Heisenberg (right) in 1962

Rabi chaired Columbia's physics department from 1945 to 1949, during which time it was home to two Nobel laureates (Rabi and Enrico Fermi) and eleven future laureates, including seven faculty (Polykarp Kusch, Willis Lamb, Maria Goeppert-Mayer, James Rainwater, Norman Ramsey, Charles Townes and Hideki Yukawa), a research scientist (Aage Bohr), a visiting professor (Hans Bethe), a doctoral student (Leon Lederman) and an undergraduate (Leon Cooper). Martin L. Perl, a doctoral student of Rabi's, won the Nobel Prize in 1995. Rabi was the Eugene Higgins professor of physics at Columbia but when Columbia created the rank of university professor in 1964, Rabi was the first to receive such a chair. This meant that he was free to research or teach whatever he chose. He retired from teaching in 1967 but remained active in the department and held the title of University Professor Emeritus until his death. A special chair was named after him in 1985.

A legacy of the Manhattan Project was the network of national laboratories, but none was located on the East Coast. Rabi and Ramsey assembled a group of universities in the New York area to lobby for their own national laboratory. When Zacharias, who was now at MIT, heard about it, he set up a rival group at MIT and Harvard. Rabi had discussions with Major General Leslie R. Groves Jr., the director of the Manhattan Project, who was willing to go along with a new national laboratory, but only one. Moreover, while the Manhattan Project still had funds, the wartime organization was expected to be phased out when a new authority came into existence. After some bargaining and lobbying by Rabi and others, the two groups came together in January 1946. Eventually, nine universities (Columbia, Cornell, Harvard, Johns Hopkins, MIT, Princeton, Pennsylvania, Rochester, and Yale) came together, and on January 31, 1947, a contract was signed with the Atomic Energy Commission (AEC), which had replaced the Manhattan Project, that established the Brookhaven National Laboratory.

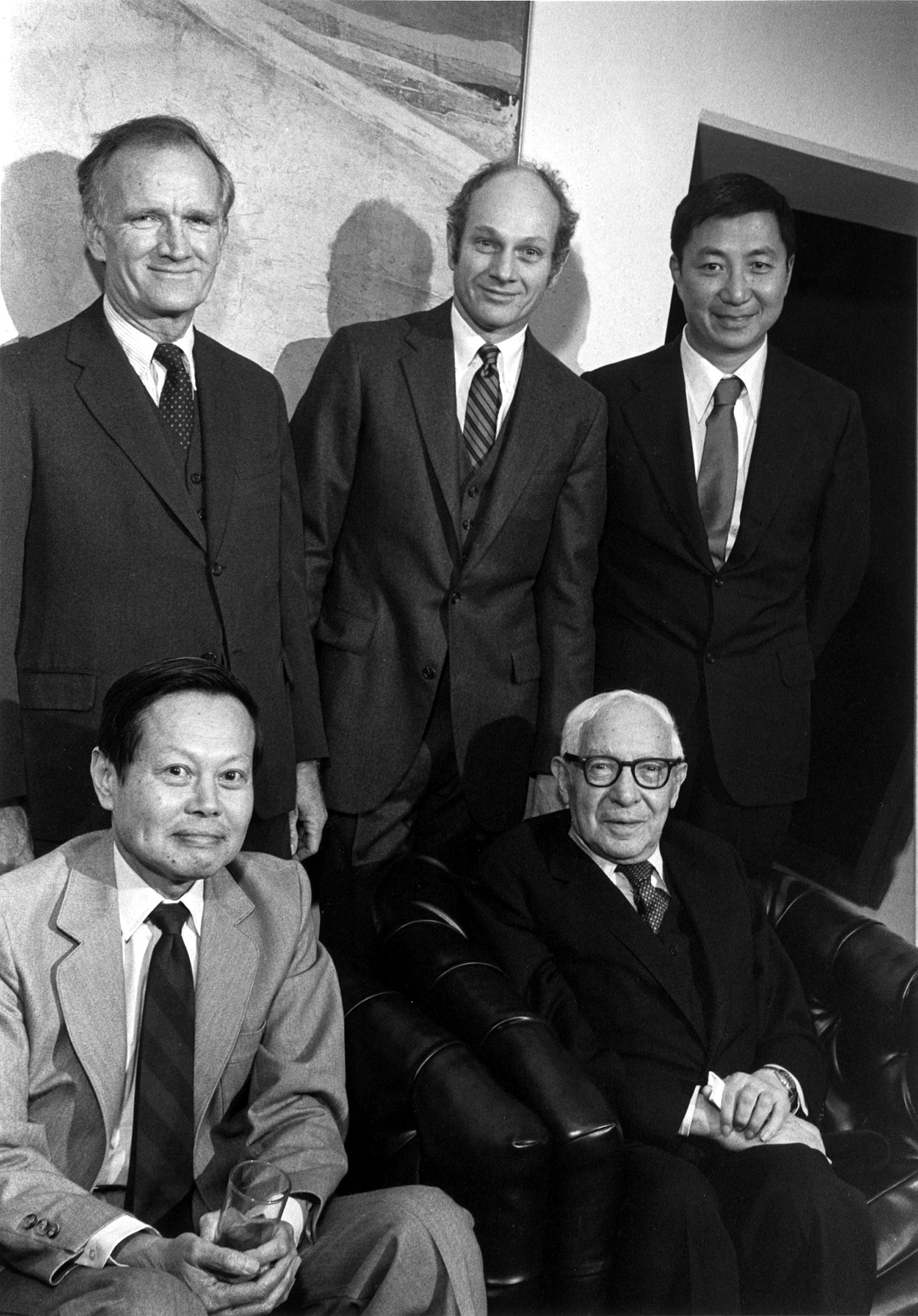
Rabi (seated R) with fellow Nobel Prize laureates Chen-Ning Yang (seated L) and Val Fitch, James Cronin, and Samuel Chao Chung Ting (standing L–R)

Rabi suggested to Edoardo Amaldi that Brookhaven might be a model that Europeans could emulate. Rabi saw science as a way of inspiring and uniting a Europe that was still recovering from the war. An opportunity came in 1950 when he was named the United States Delegate to the United Nations Educational, Scientific and Cultural Organization (UNESCO). At a UNESCO meeting at the Palazzo Vecchio in Florence in June 1950, he called for the establishment of regional laboratories. These efforts bore fruit; in 1952, representatives of eleven countries came together to create the Conseil Européen pour la Recherche Nucléaire (CERN or European Organization for Nuclear Research). Rabi received a letter from Bohr, Heisenberg, Amaldi and others congratulating him on the success of his efforts. He had the letter framed and hung it on the wall of his home office.

=== Military matters ===
The Atomic Energy Act of 1946 that created the Atomic Energy Commission provided for a nine-man General Advisory Committee (GAC) to advise the commission on scientific and technical matters. Rabi was one of those appointed in December 1946. The GAC was enormously influential throughout the late 1940s, but in 1950 the GAC unanimously opposed the development of the hydrogen bomb. Rabi went further than most of the other members, and joined Fermi in opposing the hydrogen bomb on moral as well as technical grounds. However, President Harry S. Truman overrode the GAC's advice, and ordered development to proceed. Rabi later said:

I never forgave Truman for buckling under the pressure. He simply did not understand what it was about. As a matter of fact, after he stopped being President he still didn't believe that the Russians had a bomb in 1949. He said so. So for him to have alerted the world that we were going to make a hydrogen bomb at a time when we didn't even know how to make one was one of the worst things he could have done. It shows the dangers of this sort of thing.

Oppenheimer was not reappointed to the GAC when his term expired in 1952, and Rabi succeeded him as chairman, serving until 1956. Rabi later testified on Oppenheimer's behalf at the Atomic Energy Commission's controversial security hearing in 1954 that led to Oppenheimer being stripped of his security clearance. Many witnesses supported Oppenheimer, but none more forcefully than Rabi:

So it didn't seem to me the sort of thing that called for this kind of proceeding... against a man who has accomplished what Dr. Oppenheimer has accomplished. There is a real positive record... We have an A-bomb and a whole series of it, and we have a whole series of super bombs, and what more do you want, mermaids?

Rabi was appointed a member of the Science Advisory Committee (SAC) of the Office of Defense Mobilization in 1952, serving as its chairman from 1956 to 1957. This coincided with the Sputnik crisis. President Dwight Eisenhower met with the SAC on October 15, 1957, to seek advice on possible US responses to the Soviet satellite success. Rabi, who knew Eisenhower from the latter's time as president of Columbia, was the first to speak, and put forward a series of proposals, one of which was to strengthen the committee so it could provide the President with timely advice. This was done, and the SAC became the President's Science Advisory Committee a few weeks later. He also became Eisenhower's Science Advisor. In 1956 Rabi attended the Project Nobska anti-submarine warfare conference, where discussion ranged from oceanography to nuclear weapons. He served as the U.S. representative to the NATO Science Committee at the time that the term "software engineering" was coined. While serving in that capacity, he bemoaned the fact that many large software projects were delayed. This prompted discussions that led to the formation of a study group that organized the first conference on software engineering.

=== Honors ===
In the course of his life, Rabi received many honors in addition to the Nobel Prize. These included the Elliott Cresson Medal from the Franklin Institute in 1942, the Medal for Merit and the King's Medal for Service in the Cause of Freedom from Great Britain in 1948, the officer in the French Legion of Honour in 1956, Columbia University's Barnard Medal for Meritorious Service to Science in 1960, the Niels Bohr International Gold Medal and the Atoms for Peace Award in 1967, the Oersted Medal from the American Association of Physics Teachers in 1982, the Four Freedoms Award from the Franklin and Eleanor Roosevelt Institute and the Public Welfare Medal from the National Academy of Sciences in 1985, the Golden Plate Award of the American Academy of Achievement and the Vannevar Bush Award from the National Science Foundation in 1986. He was a Fellow (elected 1931) of the American Physical Society, serving as its president in 1950, and a member of the National Academy of Sciences, the American Philosophical Society, and the American Academy of Arts and Sciences. He was internationally recognized with membership in the Japan Academy and the Brazilian Academy of Sciences, and in 1959 was appointed a member of the board of governors of the Weizmann Institute of Science in Israel. The most valuable of Columbia University's undergraduate research scholarships, designed to motivate and support promising young scientists, is named after him, as is the street, Route Rabi at CERN, on the Prévessin site in France, and the Isidor I. Rabi Institute at the Ettore Majorana Foundation and Centre for Scientific Culture in Italy. Columbia University's I. I. Rabi Scholars program assists "some of Columbia College's most promising science students at the point of admission into the College."

=== Death ===
Rabi died at his home on Riverside Drive in Manhattan from cancer on January 11, 1988. His wife, Helen, survived him and died at the age of 102 on June 18, 2005. In his last days, he was reminded of his greatest achievement when his physicians examined him using magnetic resonance imaging, a technology that had been developed from his ground-breaking research on magnetic resonance. The machine happened to have a reflective inner surface, and he remarked: "I saw myself in that machine... I never thought my work would come to this."

=== In popular culture ===
Rabi was portrayed by Barry Dennen in the 1980 television miniseries Oppenheimer, and by David Krumholtz in the 2023 film Oppenheimer.

== Books ==
- Rabi, Isidor Isaac (1960). My Life and Times as a Physicist. Claremont, California: Claremont College. OCLC 1071412.
- Rabi, Isidor Isaac; Serber, Robert; Weisskopf, Victor F.; Pais, Abraham; Seaborg, Glenn T. (1969). Oppenheimer: The Story of One of the Most Remarkable Personalities of the 20th Century. Scribner's. OCLC 223176672.
- Rabi, Isidor Isaac (1970). Science: The Center of Culture. New York: World Publishing Co. OCLC 74630.

== Notes ==
Government offices
Preceded by Lee DuBridge	Chairman of the President's Science Advisory Committee; 1956–1957	Succeeded by James Killian
