= Arthur Gordon Webster =

American physicist (1863–1923)

Arthur Webster
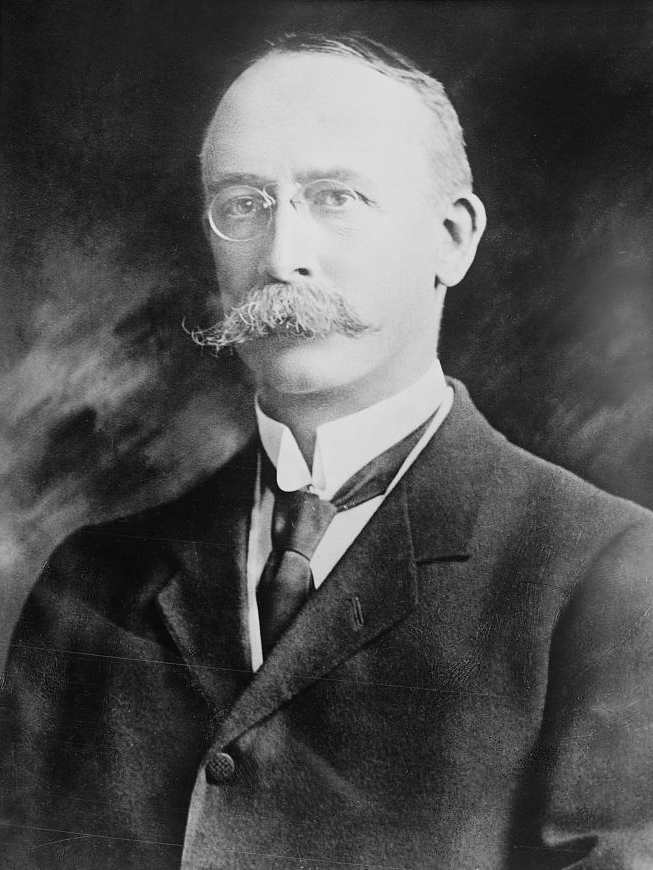
- Webster c. 1915
- Born: November 28, 1863; Brookline, Massachusetts, U.S.
- Died: May 15, 1923 (aged 59); Worcester, Massachusetts, U.S.
- Education: Harvard College; University of Berlin
- Known for: Acoustics; Ballistics; Founder of the APS
- Awards: Elihu Thomson prize (1895)
- Scientific career
- Fields: Physics
- Workplaces: Clark University
- Thesis: Versuche über eine Methode zur Bestimmung des Verhältnisses der elektromagnetischen zur elektrostatischen Einheit der Elektricität (1890)
- Doctoral advisor: Hermann von Helmholtz
- Doctoral students: Mildred Allen; Robert Goddard; Albert Potter Wills

Arthur Gordon Webster (November 28, 1863 – May 15, 1923) was an American physicist who founded the American Physical Society.

== Biography ==
Webster was born on November 28, 1863, at Brookline, Massachusetts, to William Edward Webster and Mary Shannon Davis. On October 8, 1889, he married Elizabeth Munroe Townsend, daughter of Captain Robert Townsend and Harriett Munro of Albany, New York.

Webster had graduated from Harvard College in 1885 at the top of his class and had stayed for a year as instructor in mathematics and physics. At the end of that year he went to the University of Berlin where he studied for four years with Hermann von Helmholtz, receiving his PhD in 1890. Helmholtz is said to have considered Webster his favorite American student. During this period Webster also studied in Paris and Stockholm. He was unusually proficient in literature and was fluent in Latin, Greek, German, French, and Swedish, with a good knowledge of Italian and Spanish and competency in Russian and Modern Greek.

Clark University president G. Stanley Hall appointed Webster assistant professor and head of the Physical Laboratories in 1892, when physicist Albert A. Michelson left for the newly organized University of Chicago. At that time, only Johns Hopkins University and Clark University had doctoral programs in physics. Webster was promoted to full professor in 1900.

Webster was unusual for his time in that he was both a proficient mathematician as well as a competent experimentalist.

Webster's research was in the field of acoustics and mechanics. He is credited with developing an instrument to measure the absolute intensity of sound (the phonometer) and for research on the gyroscope. He also gave graduate lectures in theoretical physics at Clark University, which have been published as three textbooks.

Webster was elected to the American Academy of Arts and Sciences in 1895. A group of 20 physicists, invited by Webster, founded the American Physical Society at a meeting at Fayerweather Hall in Columbia University on May 20, 1899. In 1903, Webster became president of the American Physical Society and was elected to the National Academy of Sciences. He was elected to the American Philosophical Society in 1906.

Webster committed suicide in 1923, following the closure of the mathematics department at Clark, after it was rumored that the physics department would be the next to be closed by the new president. With a revolver he had bought a few hours before, Webster shot himself twice in the head in his private office while a class waited for him next door. He left a note to his son which read;

Dear Gordon: This is the only way. For years I have been a failure - my research is worth nothing. Everyone else knows it, and S.N. physics has got away from me and I cannot come back. Everything I have started has stalled. Students will not come and they will put me out. Your mother will not see. She will get over this. Take care of her. I am sorry for the trouble I have caused you. Am sorry to make so much trouble. Do your best and tell the truth. With my best love, "Papa"

== Books by Webster ==
- Theory of Electricity and Magnetism, Being Lectures On Mathematical Physics (London, MacMillan, 1897)
- The Dynamics of Particles and of Rigid, Elastic, and Fluid Bodies: Being Lectures On Mathematical Physics (Leipzig, B.G. Teubner, 1912)
- The Partial Differential Equations of Mathematical Physics (1927) (posthumous, with a second edition by Samuel J. Plimpton published by Teubner in 1933. This second edition was reprinted by Dover in 1966)
