= Albert Potter Wills =

American physicist (1873–1937)

Albert Wills
- Born: February 23, 1873; Waltham, Massachusetts, U.S.
- Died: April 17, 1937 (aged 64); St. Augustine, Florida, U.S.
- Education: Clark University
- Scientific career
- Fields: Physicist
- Workplaces: University of Göttingen; University of Berlin; Bryn Mawr College; Cooper Hewitt Laboratory; Columbia University
- Thesis: On the susceptibility of diamagnetic and weakly magnetic substances (1897)
- Doctoral advisor: Arthur Gordon Webster
- Doctoral students: Isidor Isaac Rabi; Francis Bitter; Ralph De Laer Kronig; Shirley Leon Quimby

Albert Potter Wills (February 23, 1873 – April 17, 1937) was an American physicist who researched magnetic materials and was the PhD advisor of the Nobel Prize winner Isidor Isaac Rabi.

During his career he investigated magnetic susceptibilities, magnetic shielding, magnetostriction, conduction of electricity through mercury vapor, and hydrodynamics. He also wrote a textbook on vector analysis.

Wills received his PhD from Clark University in 1897 under Arthur Gordon Webster with the thesis On the Susceptibility of Diamagnetic and Weakly Magnetic Substances.

During 1898–1899 Wills worked at the University of Göttingen and the University of Berlin. From 1899 to 1902 he was at Bryn Mawr College and from 1902 to 1903 at the Cooper Hewitt Laboratory. His final appointment, from 1903 to 1937, was at Columbia University.

In 1909 at Columbia University, Max Planck gave eight lectures in German. Wills translated the lectures into English, and in 1915 Columbia University Press published his translation.
