= Pulsed field magnet =

Type of electromagnet designed for very high fields

A pulsed field magnet is a strong electromagnet which is powered by a brief pulse of electric current through its windings rather than a continuous current, producing a brief but strong pulse of magnetic field. Pulsed field magnets are used in research in fields such as materials science to study the effect of strong magnetic fields, since they can produce stronger fields than continuous magnets. The maximum field strength that continuously-powered high-field electromagnets can produce is limited by the enormous waste heat generated in the windings by the large currents required. Therefore by applying brief pulses of current, with time between the pulses to allow the heat to dissipate, stronger currents can be used and thus stronger magnetic fields can be generated. The magnetic field produced by pulsed field magnets can reach between 50 and 100 T, and lasts several tens of milliseconds.
