= Polykarp Kusch =

German–American physicist (1911–1993)

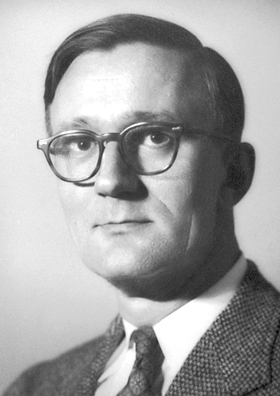
- Kusch in 1955
- Born: January 26, 1911; Blankenburg, Duchy of Brunswick, German Empire
- Died: March 20, 1993 (aged 82); Dallas, Texas, U.S.
- Education: University of Illinois; Case Western Reserve University
- Known for: Measuring the magnetic moment of the electron
- Awards: Nobel Prize in Physics (1955)
- Scientific career
- Fields: Physics
- Workplaces: University of Texas at Dallas; Columbia University
- Thesis: The molecular spectra of caesium and rubidium (1936)
- Doctoral advisor: Francis Wheeler Loomis
- Doctoral students: Eugene D. Commins; Gordon Gould; Sheldon Schultz

Polykarp Kusch (German: [ˈpoːliˌkaʁp ˈkuʃ]; January 26, 1911 – March 20, 1993) was a German–American physicist who shared the 1955 Nobel Prize in Physics with Willis Eugene Lamb for his accurate determination that the electron magnetic moment was greater than its theoretical value, thus leading to reconsideration of and innovations in quantum electrodynamics.

== Biography ==
Polykarp Kusch was born on January 26, 1911, in Blankenburg, Germany, the son of John Mathias Kusch, a Lutheran missionary, and Henrietta van der Haas. In 1912, Kusch and his family emigrated to the United States, where he naturalized as a U.S. citizen in 1922.

After graduating from grade school in the Midwest, Kusch attended Case Institute of Technology (CIT) in Cleveland, Ohio (now Case Western Reserve University), where he majored in physics. After graduating from CIT with a B.S. in 1931, Kusch entered the University of Illinois, from which he received his M.S. in 1933. He continued his education at the same alma mater, studying under Francis Wheeler Loomis. For his work in the field of optical molecular spectroscopy, he received his Ph.D. in 1936.

In 1937, Kusch moved to Columbia University, where he spent much of his career as a professor and served as its provost for one year in 1970–1971. He worked on molecular beam resonance studies under I. I. Rabi, then discovered the electron anomalous magnetic moment. Many measurements of magnetic moments and hyperfine structure followed. He expanded into chemical physics and continued to publish research on molecular beams. In 1972, he left Columbia to become a professor at the University of Texas at Dallas, remaining there until his retirement in 1982.

== Personal life ==
In 1935, Kusch married Edith Starr McRoberts, with whom he had three daughters. Edith died in 1959, and the following year he married Betty Pezzoni. They had two daughters. Kusch House, a residential dormitory for undergraduate students at Case Western Reserve University in Cleveland, Ohio on the South Campus, is named after Kusch. It is located on Carlton Road in Cleveland Heights. The University of Texas at Dallas has a Polykarp Kusch Auditorium with a plaque.

Kusch died on March 20, 1993, in Dallas at the age of 82.

== Recognition ==
=== Memberships ===
Year	Organization	Type	Ref.
1940	(United States) American Physical Society	Fellow	
1956	(United States) National Academy of Sciences	Emeritus	
1959	(United States) American Academy of Arts and Sciences	Member	
1967	(United States) American Philosophical Society	Member	

=== Awards ===
Year	Organization	Award	Citation	Ref.
1955	(Sweden) Royal Swedish Academy of Sciences	Nobel Prize in Physics (Note: Shared with Willis Lamb.)	"For his precision determination of the magnetic moment of the electron."	

== Publications ==
- Rabi, I. I.; Zacharias, J. R.; Millman, S.; Kusch, P. (1938). "A New Method of Measuring Nuclear Magnetic Moment". Physical Review. 53 (4): 318. Bibcode:1938PhRv...53..318R. doi:10.1103/PhysRev.53.318.
- Rabi, I. I.; Millman, S.; Kusch, P.; Zacharias, J. R. (1939). "The Molecular Beam Resonance Method for Measuring Nuclear Magnetic Moments. The Magnetic Moments of 3Li6, 3Li7 and 9F19". Physical Review. 55 (6): 526–535. Bibcode:1939PhRv...55..526R. doi:10.1103/PhysRev.55.526.
- Rabi, I. I.; Zacharias, J. R.; Millman, S.; Kusch, P. (1992). "Milestones in Magnetic Resonance: 'A new method of measuring nuclear magnetic moment'. 1938". Journal of Magnetic Resonance Imaging. 2 (2): 131–133. doi:10.1002/jmri.1880020203. PMID 1562763. S2CID 73238886.
- Kusch, P.; Foley, H. M. (1948). "The Magnetic Moment of the Electron". Physical Review. 74 (3): 250–263. Bibcode:1948PhRv...74..250R. doi:10.1103/PhysRev.74.250. PMID 17820251.

== See also ==
- List of Case Western Reserve University people
