= Barnard Medal for Meritorious Service to Science =

Science award given by Columbia University

- Awarded for: "Meritorious Service to Science"
- Sponsored by: Frederick A. P. Barnard
- Date: 1895; 131 years ago
- Country: International
- Presented by: Columbia University, National Academy of Sciences

The Barnard Medal for Meritorious Service to Science was established in 1889 by the will of Columbia University president Frederick A. P. Barnard, and has been awarded by Columbia University, based on recommendations by the National Academy of Sciences, every five years since 1895. It is not to be confused with the Barnard Medal of Distinction.

== Winners ==
- 1895 - John William Strutt, Lord Rayleigh, William Ramsay
- 1900 - Wilhelm Röntgen
- 1905 - Henri Becquerel
- 1910 - Ernest Rutherford
- 1915 - William Henry Bragg, William Lawrence Bragg
- 1920 - Albert Einstein
- 1925 - Niels Bohr
- 1930 - Werner Heisenberg
- 1935 - Edwin Hubble
- 1940 - Frédéric Joliot-Curie, Irène Joliot-Curie
- 1945 - No award
- 1950 - Enrico Fermi
- 1955 - Merle Tuve
- 1960 - I. I. Rabi
- 1965 - William Alfred Fowler
- 1970 - No award
- 1975 - Louis Plack Hammett
- 1980 - André Weil
- 1985 - Benoit Mandelbrot
- 1990 - No award
- 1995 - No award
- 2000 - No award
- 2005 - No award
- 2010 - No award

== Establishment of the Barnard Medal for Meritorious Service to Science ==
“The Trustees of Columbia College shall cause to be struck, with suitable devices, a medal of gold, nine-tenths fine, of the bullion value of not less two hundred dollars, to be styled “THE BARNARD MEDAL FOR MERITORIOUS SERVICE TO SCIENCE,” and shall publicly announce that a copy of the same will be awarded, at the close of every quinquennial period, dating from the probate of this my last Will and Testament, to such person, whether a citizen of the United States of or any other country, as shall, within the five years next preceding, have made such discovery in physical or astronomical science, or such novel application of science to purposes beneficial to the human race, as, in the judgment of the National Academy of Sciences of the United States, shall be esteemed most worthy of such an honor. And I make it my request that the said National Academy of Sciences shall charge itself with the duty of declaring to the Trustees of Columbia College, aforesaid, at the close of every term of five years, as above defined, the name of the person whom they judge worthy to receive such medal, with a statement of the reasons on which their judgment is founded; and that upon such declaration and nomination, the Trustees shall proceed to award the said medal, and shall transmit the same to the person entitled to receive it, accompanied by a diploma or certificate attesting the fact and the occasion of the award. But, if the National Academy of Sciences shall judge that, during the five years preceding the date at which, as above provided, this award shall become due, no discovery in physical or astronomical science, or no new application of scientific principles to useful purposes, has been made worthy of the distinction proposed, then it is my wish and request the award shall be for that time omitted. And I would further desire, that the medal above described should bear, if it can be accomplished without interfering with the appropriate artistic devices upon its obverse side, the motto, Magna est Veritas, and upon its reverse the motto, Deo optimo Maximo, Gloria in Excelsis.”

— Frederick A. P. Barnard, Last Will and Testament of Frederick A.P. Barnard, Tenth President of Columbia University in the City of New York. Born May 25, 1809. Died April 27, 1889.

In awarding the Barnard Medal in 1910 President Butler of Columbia University said :

"In accordance with the terms of the will of Frederick A. P. Barnard, tenth president of Columbia University, a gold medal is established known as the Barnard Medal for Meritorious Service to Science. This medal is awarded at Commencement at the close of every quinquennial period to such person, if any, whether a citizen of the United States or of any other country, as shall, within the five years next preceding have made such discovery in physical or astronomical science, or such novel application of science to purposes beneficial to the human race as, in the judgment of the National Academy of Sciences of the United States, shall be deemed most worthy of such honor.

"The Barnard medal was first awarded at the Commencement of 1895 to John William Strutt Lord Rayleigh and to Professor (now Sir) William Ramsay. At the Commencement of 1900 the Barnard medal was awarded to Professor Wilhelm Röntgen. At the Commencement of 1905 the Barnard medal was awarded to M. Henri Becquerel, member of the Institute of France.

"On the nomination of the National Academy of Sciences, the award for 1910 is made to Ernest Rutherford, Sc.D., LL.D., F.R.S., Langworthy Professor of physics and director of the physical laboratory in the University of Manchester, for meritorious service to science, resulting especially from his investigations of the phenomena of radio-active materials."

— President Nicholas Murray Butler, Columbia University Quarterly

== See also ==
- List of general science and technology awards
- List of physics awards
