= Bitter electromagnet =

Solenoid creating strong magnetic fields

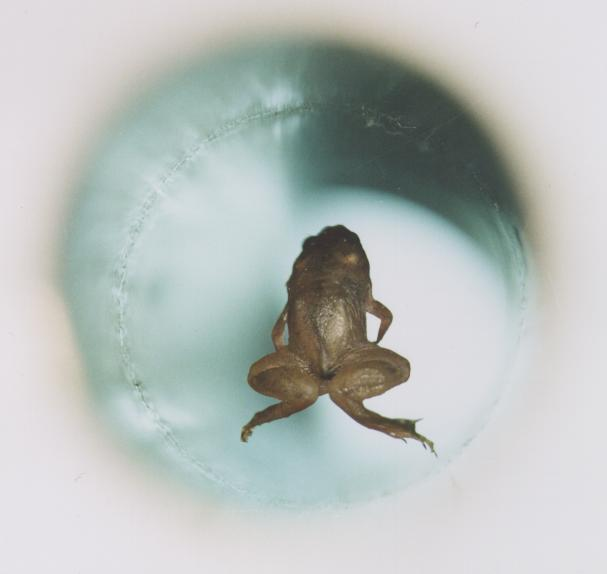
Diamagnetic forces acting upon the water within its body levitating a live frog inside the 3.2 cm vertical bore of a Bitter solenoid at the Nijmegen High Field Magnet Laboratory, Nijmegen, Netherlands. The magnetic field was about 16 teslas. Video is available.

A Bitter electromagnet or Bitter solenoid is a type of electromagnet developed in the 1930s by American physicist Francis Bitter and used in scientific research to create extremely strong magnetic fields. Bitter electromagnets have been used to achieve the strongest continuous manmade magnetic fields on earth―up to about 45 teslas in hybrid magnets.

== History ==
The design was developed in the 1930s by American physicist Francis Bitter at the Massachusetts Institute of Technology, and named in his honor.

== Characteristics ==
Bitter electromagnets are used where extremely strong fields are required. The iron cores used in conventional electromagnets saturate, and are limited to fields of about 2 teslas. Superconducting electromagnets can produce stronger magnetic fields, but only up to about 25 teslas, a limit set by the critical current of the superconducting wire. For stronger fields resistive solenoid electromagnets of the Bitter design are used. Their disadvantage is that they require very high drive currents, and dissipate large quantities of heat.

== Construction ==
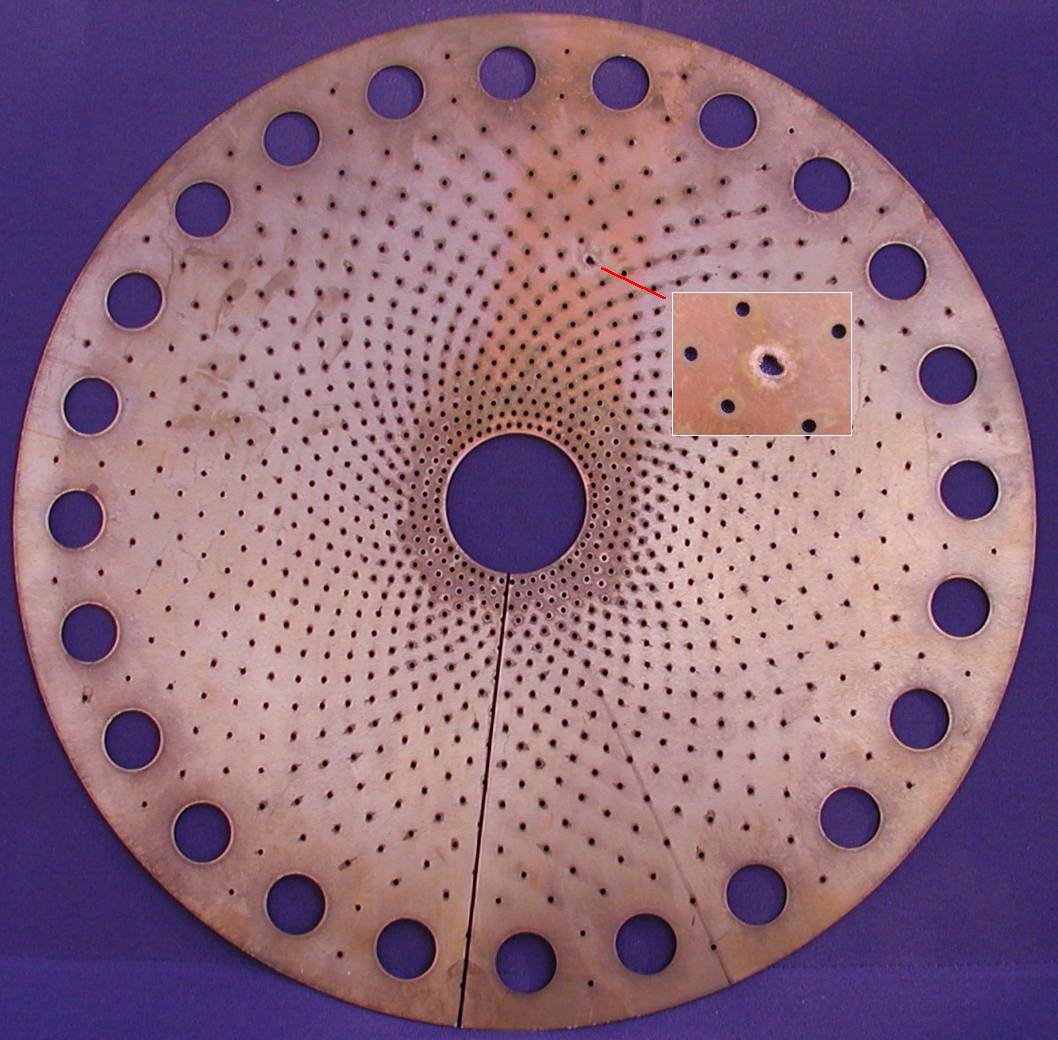
Plate from a 16 T Bitter magnet, 40 cm diameter, made of copper. In operation it carries a current of 20 kiloamperes

Bitter magnets are constructed of circular conducting metal plates (known as Bitter plates) and insulating spacers stacked in a helical configuration, rather than coils of wire. The current flows in a helical path through the plates. The purpose of the stacked plate design is to withstand the enormous outward mechanical pressure produced by Lorentz forces due to the magnetic field acting on the moving electric charges in the plate, which increase with the square of the magnetic field strength. Additionally, water circulates through holes in the plates as a coolant, to carry away the enormous heat created in the plates due to resistive heating by the large currents flowing through them. The heat dissipation also increases with the square of the magnetic field strength.

In the mid-1990s researchers at the National High Magnetic Field Laboratory (NHMFL) at Florida State University in Tallahassee improved on this basic design and created what they refer to as the Florida Bitter. The Florida Bitter plate uses staggered rows of elongated cooling holes instead of round holes, which improves the mechanical strength, current-carrying capacity and cooling of the magnet. The National High Magnetic Field Laboratory puts the gain in efficiency at 40 percent. Florida Bitter magnets are now used at many of the world's high-field magnet laboratories.

== Current density and magnetic flux density ==
Unlike a copper wire, the current density of a current carrying disc is not uniform across its cross-sectional area, but is instead a function of the ratio of the inner diameter of the disc to an arbitrary radius within the disc. The implications of this relationship is that the current density decreases with an increase in radius. As such, the bulk of the current is flowing closer to the inner radius of the disc. Large discs (i.e., disc with a large difference between their inner and outer radius) will have a larger discrepancy in the current density between the inner and outer portions of the disc. This will reduce the efficiency and cause additional complications in the system because there will be a more substantial temperature and stress gradient along the disc. As such, a series of nested coils is often used as it will more evenly distribute the current across a large combined area as opposed to a single coil with large discs.

The non-uniform current density must also be considered when calculating the magnetic flux density. Ampère's Law for a basic current carrying loop of wire gives that the on-axis magnetic flux is proportional to the current running through the wire and is related to the basic geometry of the loop, but is not concerned with the geometry of the cross section of the wire. The current density is uniform across the cross-sectional area of a wire. This is not the case for a Bitter disc. As such, the current term must be replaced with terms discussing the cross-sectional area of the disc and the current density. The equation for the on-axis magnetic flux density of a Bitter disc becomes much more complex as a result.

The differential flux density is related to the current density and the differential area. The introduction of a space factor must be included to compensate for variations in the disc related to cooling and mounting holes.

== Records ==
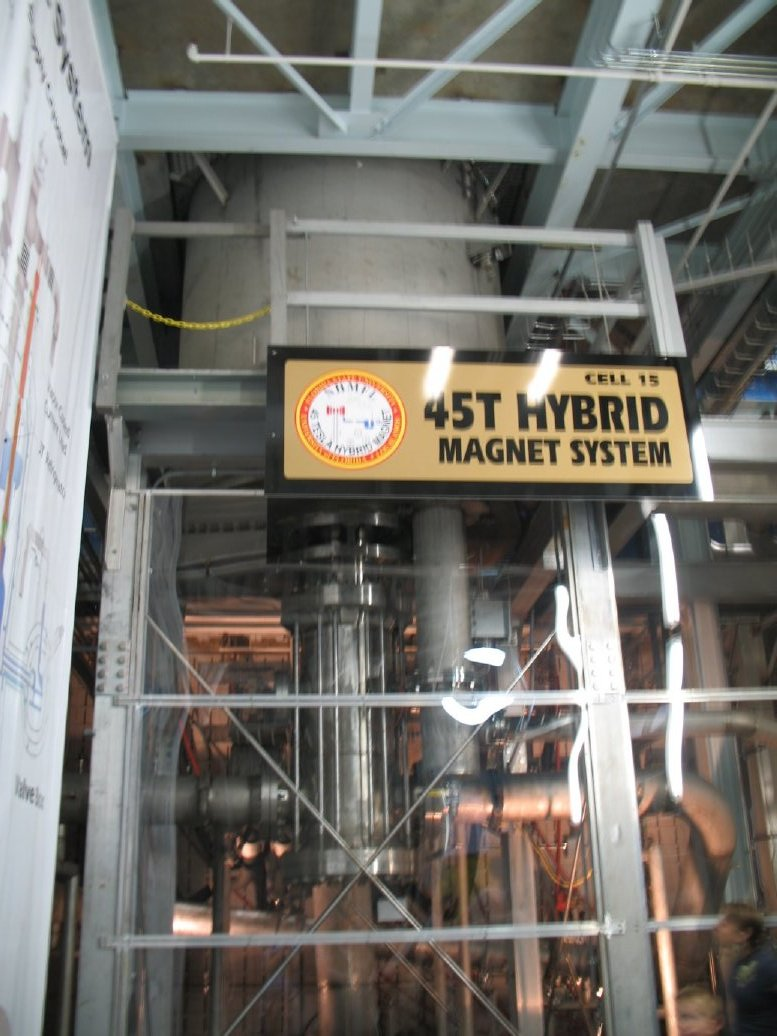
The most powerful electromagnet in the world, the 45 T hybrid Bitter-superconducting magnet at the US National High Magnetic Field Laboratory, Tallahassee, Florida, USA

The strongest continuous magnetic fields on Earth have been produced by Bitter magnets. The strongest continuous field achieved solely with a resistive magnet was 41.4 tesla as of 22 August 2017, produced by a Bitter electromagnet at the National High Magnetic Field Laboratory in Tallahassee, Florida. On 22 September 2024 a resistive magnet at the High Magnetic Field Laboratory of the Chinese Academy of Sciences in Hefei, China, reached 42.02 tesla at 32.3 MW of power, breaking that record.

As of 31 March 2014 the strongest continuous field achieved by a room temperature magnet is 37.5 T produced by a Bitter electromagnet at the Radboud University High Field Magnet Laboratory in Nijmegen, Netherlands.

The record for the strongest continuous manmade magnetic field, 45 T, was set in 1999 by a hybrid device at the National High Magnetic Field Laboratory, consisting of a Bitter magnet inside a superconducting magnet. The resistive magnet produces 33.5 T and the superconducting coil produces the remaining 11.5 T. The former magnet requires 30 MW of power, the latter must be kept at 1.8 K (−456.43 °F) using liquid helium, taking 6 weeks to cool. It costs $1452 per hour to run at full field. In 2019, another partially-superconducting electromagnet achieved the world record for a static DC magnetic field: 45.5 T. In 2022 a 45.22 T hybrid magnet at the Hefei laboratory became the world's most powerful hybrid magnet.

== See also ==
- Superconducting magnet
