= Henry M. Foley =

American physicist

Henry Michael Foley (1917–1982) was an American experimental physicist.

He was a professor and a leading physicist at Columbia University, later serving as chairman of the physics department. In 1948, Polykarp Kusch, working with Henry Foley, discovered the anomalous magnetic dipole moment of the electron. He served on the JASON Defense Advisory Group, an independent group of scientists which advises the United States Government on matters of science and technology. He also served on the MX Missile Basing advisory panel.
