= Phonometer =

Instrument used to measure the force of the human speaking voice

A phonometer is an instrument invented by Thomas Edison for testing the force of the human voice in speaking. It consists chiefly of a mouthpiece and diaphragm. Behind the diaphragm is placed a delicate mechanism which operates a 15-inch flywheel by means of which a hole can be bored in an ordinary pine board.
