= F. Wheeler Loomis =

American scientist

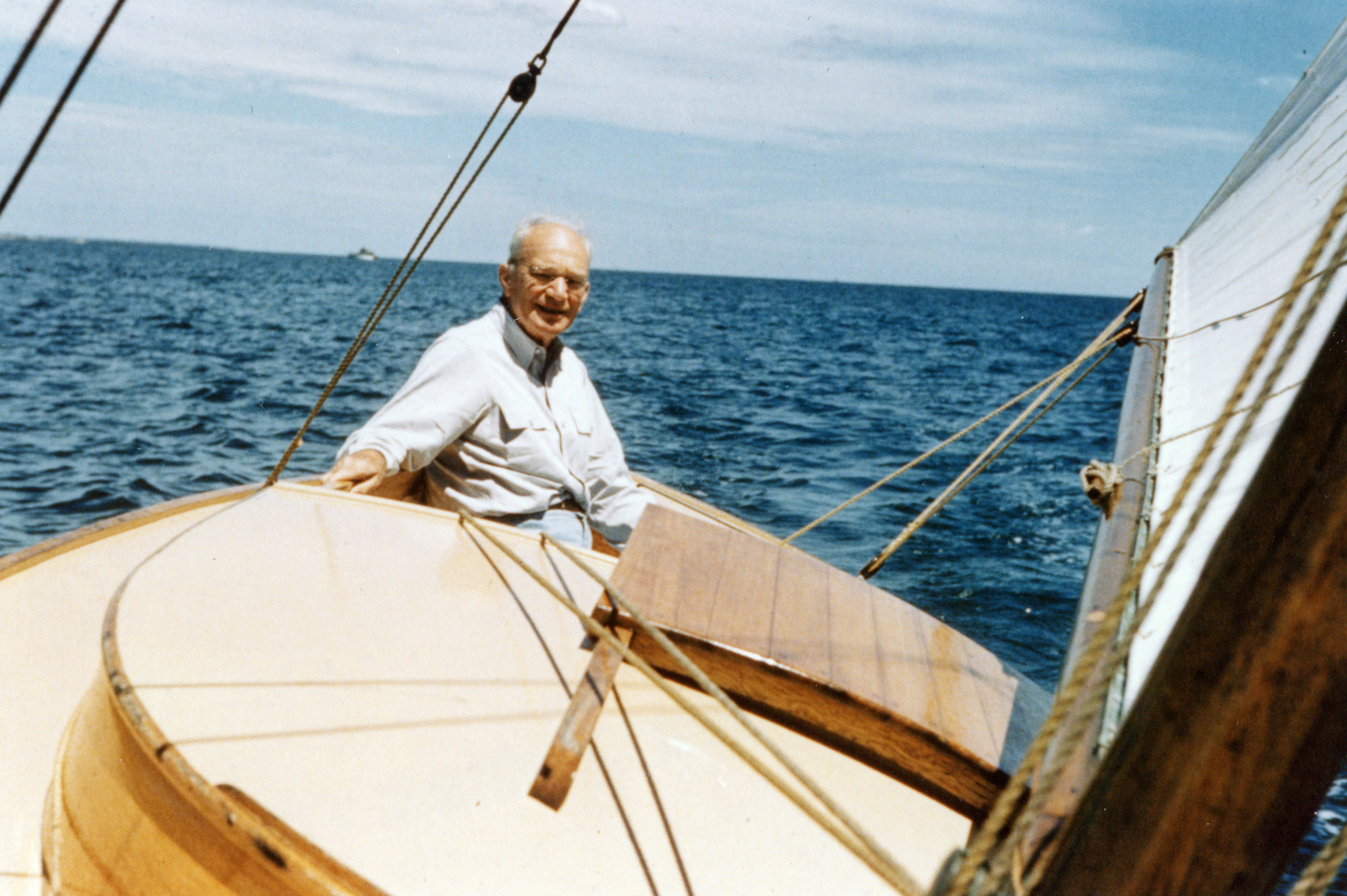
- Loomis circa 1960
- Born: August 4, 1889; Parkersburg, West Virginia, U.S.
- Died: February 9, 1976 (aged 86); Urbana, Illinois, U.S.
- Education: Harvard University
- Scientific career
- Fields: Physics
- Workplaces: Westinghouse Electric Corporation; Aberdeen Proving Ground; New York University; University of Illinois at Urbana Champaign; MIT Radiation Laboratory; MIT Lincoln Laboratory
- Thesis: The heat of vaporization of mercury (1917)
- Doctoral advisor: Harvey N. Davis
- Doctoral students: Polykarp Kusch

Francis Wheeler Loomis (August 4, 1889 – February 9, 1976), born in Parkersburg, West Virginia, was an American scientist most widely known for his contributions in the field of physics. Loomis received his undergraduate degree and, in 1917, his PhD from Harvard University. His thesis was on thermodynamic measurements of mercury.

Loomis was a Guggenheim Fellow in 1928 studying abroad at Zürich and Göttingen. In 1929, Loomis came to the University of Illinois Urbana-Champaign to become the head of the department of physics, a position he would retain until 1957. Loomis was challenged in bringing top-notch physics talent to a university in the rural Midwest. While building the department, Loomis attracted two-time Nobel recipient John Bardeen to join the staff, and had 1955 Nobel Prize winner Polykarp Kusch as a graduate student. Loomis was elected president of the American Physical Society and a member of the National Academy of Sciences in 1949.

In World War I, Loomis served at the Aberdeen Proving Ground, where he was an Army Ordnance captain. During World War II, he was the associate director of the Radiation Laboratory at MIT supporting the national defense and served a two-year period as the organizer of the MIT Lincoln Laboratory. The interruption of the war also required Loomis to restart his building of the physics department as two-thirds of the faculty he added in the 1930s moved elsewhere due to the many defense projects related to the war. Loomis founded the Control Systems Laboratory as a research center for national defense purposes during the Korean War. After the war ended and the work done there became unclassified, the facility was renamed the Coordinated Science Laboratory.

At the University of Illinois Urbana-Champaign the main physics building was renamed the Loomis Laboratory of Physics posthumously in his honor.
