= Francis Bitter =

American physicist (1902–1967)

- Born: July 22, 1902; Weehawken, New Jersey
- Died: July 26, 1967 (aged 65)
- Education: Columbia; Berlin
- Known for: Bitter electromagnet
- Scientific career
- Fields: Physics
- Workplaces: Caltech; Westinghouse; MIT
- Doctoral advisor: Albert Potter Wills
- Doctoral students: Robert C. Richardson, Jean Brossel

Francis Bitter (July 22, 1902 – July 26, 1967) was an American physicist.

Bitter invented the Bitter plate used in resistive magnets (also called Bitter electromagnets). He also developed the water cooling method inherent to the design of Bitter magnets. Prior to this development, there was no way to cool electromagnets, limiting their maximum flux density.

== Early life ==
Francis Bitter was born in Weehawken, New Jersey. His father, Karl Bitter, was a prominent sculptor.

Bitter entered the University of Chicago in 1919, but chose to leave his studies there in 1922 to visit Europe. He later transferred to Columbia University and graduated in 1925. He continued his studies in Berlin from 1925 to 1926 and received a PhD at Columbia in 1928. At Columbia, Bitter began his lifelong fascination with magnets.

== Career ==
Under a National Research Council fellowship, Bitter studied gases at Caltech with Robert Andrews Millikan, from 1928 to 1930. While at Caltech, he married the Sheffield-born Alice Coomaraswamy. She had been a moderately successful singer working under the stage name Ratan Devi.

In 1930, Bitter went to work for Westinghouse, where he worked on various theoretical and applied problems concerning ferromagnetism.

With a Guggenheim Fellowship, Bitter travelled to England in 1933 and worked at the Cavendish Laboratory at Cambridge University. There, he worked with Peter Kapitza on pulsed magnetic fields.

The following year, Bitter returned to America and his work at Westinghouse. Later in 1934, he joined the faculty at the Massachusetts Institute of Technology and continued to consult for Westinghouse.

=== At M.I.T. ===
Bitter joined the Department of Mining and Metallurgy as an associate professor in 1934. (The department is now known as Materials Science and Engineering.)

While at MIT, he developed the Bitter electromagnet which was/is the most powerful electromagnet design. He established a magnet laboratory in 1938, where he built a solenoid magnet that produced a constant field of 100,000 gauss (10 teslas).

He also did work in the first characterization of the Zeeman effect with George Harrison.

During the Second World War, Bitter worked for the Naval Bureau of Ordnance. He often traveled to England to find ways to demagnetize British ships to protect them from a new type of German mine, which used a compass needle to trigger detonation. The mine, dropped from the air, would sink to the bottom of a river and remain there with its magnetic needle aligned to the Earth's magnetic field at that location. When a ship passed over it, the mass of the ship caused the magnetic needle to move slightly. The movement was enough to detonate the mine. In his autobiography Magnets, the Education of a Physicist, he referred to this unique work as "Degaussing the fleet". (It is possible that he worked with Francis Crick, who was researching the same problem.)

After the war, Bitter returned to MIT and joined the faculty of the physics department. He became a full professor in 1951, and from 1956 to 1960, he served as associate dean of MIT's school of science. From 1962 to 1965, Bitter was the housemaster of Ashdown House, MIT's graduate dormitory.

== Legacy ==
The Francis Bitter Magnet Laboratory, formerly a national laboratory, in Cambridge is named in his honor.

== See also ==
- MIT Physics Department
