= Robert E. Cox =

American optical engineer

Robert Edward Cox
- Born: March 12, 1917; Cleveland, Ohio
- Died: December 16, 1989 (aged 72)
- Occupations: Optical engineer, science curator and writer
- Employer: McDonnell Douglas Corporation
- Known for: Popularizing amateur telescope making

Robert Edward Cox (March 12, 1917 – December 16, 1989) was an American optical engineer and a popularizer of amateur telescope making. He conducted the popular "Gleanings for ATMs" (Amateur Telescope Makers) column in Sky and Telescope magazine for 21 years.

== Career ==
Cox worked briefly at Perkin Elmer in 1939. Shortly thereafter he was inducted into the Army Air Corps and served for two years in the South Pacific as a weather specialist. After the war, Cox accepted part-time positions as photographic technician at Harvard Observatory and as staff member at Sky and Telescope. He also became associate editor of Weatherwise magazine.

In 1949, Cox became science curator at the Stamford Museum and Nature Center in Connecticut, operating its Spitz planetarium projector and developing science activities for the public. In 1953 he began work at Boston University's Optical Research Laboratories, making the prototype optics for military aerial cameras designed by James G. Baker. In 1957, Cox returned to making commercial optics at the A. D. Jones Optical Works.

In 1960, Cox joined the McDonnell Aircraft Co. (now McDonnell-Douglas) in St. Louis, Missouri. His optical shop produced prototypes in connection with flight testing of Voodoo and Phantom fighter planes, as well as for the Mercury and Gemini spacecraft. Optics from his shop flew on all American crewed space missions up through Gemini 8. Cox retired from McDonnell-Douglas in 1982 with the rank of senior engineer.

== Amateur telescope making ==
Cox built his first telescope, a 6-inch reflector, at age 16 and four years later had completed a 10-inch reflector as well. With Lou Lojas, Ed Hanna and Carl Groswendt, he founded the Amateur Telescope Makers of New York which became the Optical Division of the New York Amateur Astronomers Association in 1937. The Optical Division conducted evening telescope making classes in the basement of New York's Hayden Planetarium. Cox became a member of the office staff; while there, he started reading proof for planetarium director Clyde Fisher's new astronomy magazine The Sky beginning with its November 1937 issue.

During the solar eclipse of April 7, 1940, which was partial in New York City, Cox assisted in the first public use of television to cover an astronomical event.

When Earle Brown stepped down as conductor of Sky and Telescope's "Gleanings for ATMs" column in 1956, Cox took over the department, which he ran until December 1977, for a total of 254 installments. The columns contained practical telescope making ideas, shop techniques, and wisdom drawn from his professional career as an optical engineer. Some of the early columns were later collected into a book, Gleanings Bulletin C.

Through the early Stellafane meetings, Cox came to know Russell W. Porter and Albert G. Ingalls. Cox has been described as their "undisputed heir". Like Ingalls, Cox consistently advocated the highest standards for amateur telescope makers. In a 1956 review of the 12th printing of Ingalls' Amateur Telescope Making, Cox wrote:

It is generally conceded that anyone who mounts a mirror or lens as a telescope for viewing celestial objects has become a telescope "nut" regardless of how the optics were obtained. There is only one important requirement – that the optics be of first quality, capable of giving satisfactory views of the moon, the sun, double stars, cluster, nebulae, and the planets.

Cox maintained a voluminous correspondence with both amateurs and professionals throughout his life. He was a frequent and sought-after speaker at meetings of amateur astronomers.

== Death ==
Cox died of emphysema, contracted apparently from frequent on-the-job exposure to extremely fine glass particles produced by high-speed shaping machines with diamond-impregnated cutting tools.

The 1990 Riverside Telescope Makers Conference was dedicated to his memory.

== Awards ==
- Astronomical League Award (1962)
- Clifford W. Holmes Award (1980)

== Named after him ==
- Asteroid 15965 Robertcox
