= John M. Pierce =

American teacher and amateur astronomer

- Born: 1886
- Died: 4 March 1958; Maitland, Florida, United States
- Occupations: Teacher, scientific instrument maker

John M. Pierce (1886 – March 4, 1958) was an American teacher and amateur astronomer.

Pierce worked with Russell W. Porter to organize Stellafane, the observatory near Springfield, Vermont, where amateur telescope makers still meet annually for the Stellafane convention. He was one of the earliest members of the Springfield Telescope Makers and served as its vice president.

Pierce contributed many articles to the telescope making column conducted by Albert G. Ingalls in Scientific American, and wrote several chapters in the Amateur Telescope Making series of books, including "Motor Drives", "Making Astronomical Flats", and "A Telescope Anyone Can Make" (the latter appeared only in the earliest printings). When the hobby was new and supplies were hard to come by, Pierce set up a small business to provide kits and parts for amateur astronomers.

Drawing by John M. Pierce of a simple Newtonian reflecting telescope. From "How To Make A Reflecting Telescope" (1934)

In 1933 and 1934 he published a series of 14 articles on telescope making in Hugo Gernsback's Everyday Science and Mechanics called "Hobbygrafs" (or sometimes "Hobbygraphs").

Robert E. Cox, in an obituary for Sky and Telescope magazine in 1958, considered John M. Pierce on a par with Ingalls and Porter, describing him as one of "the big three behind the amateur telescope making movement in America."

== Biography ==
Pierce graduated in architectural engineering from Pratt Institute in 1910. He spent most of his life as a teacher; from 1919 to 1956 he was director of the Springfield High School co-operative course, which included training in machine-tool work, cabinet making, sheet-metal work and auto repair. He was also active in civic affairs and well known as a musician and amateur geologist.
