= The Amateur Astronomer =

American monthly magazine (1929–1935)

The Amateur Astronomer was a four-page bulletin published between 1929 and 1935 by the Amateur Astronomers Association of New York. C. S. Brainin was the first editor; a section called "Meteor Notes" was edited by Virginia Geiger starting in 1933.

In 1935, The Amateur Astronomer merged into The Sky published by the Hayden Planetarium. In 1941, The Sky merged with The Telescope to become Sky & Telescope, which has remained in print since then.
