= 3031 Houston =

Main-belt asteroid

Discovery
- Discovered by: E. Bowell
- Discovery site: Anderson Mesa Stn.
- Discovery date: 8 February 1984

Designations
- Named after: Walter Scott Houston (American amateur astronomer)
- Alternative designations: 1984 CX · 1954 EF; 1978 NP · 1979 VT_{1} 1981 JL_{1}
- Minor planet category: main-belt · (inner); Flora

Orbital characteristics
- Epoch 4 September 2017 (JD 2458000.5)
- Uncertainty parameter 0
- Observation arc: 63.16 yr (23,071 days)
- Aphelion: 2.4553 AU
- Perihelion: 2.0169 AU
- Semi-major axis: 2.2361 AU
- Eccentricity: 0.0980
- Orbital period (sidereal): 3.34 yr (1,221 days)
- Mean anomaly: 330.84°
- Mean motion: 0° 17^{m} 41.28^{s} / day
- Inclination: 4.3407°
- Longitude of ascending node: 317.78°
- Argument of perihelion: 249.40°

Physical characteristics
- Dimensions: 5.45±0.81 km 6.43±0.14 km 6.430±0.141 km 6.761±0.028 km 7.14 km (calculated)
- Synodic rotation period: 5.61±0.060 h (half); 11.175±0.0532 h 11.218±0.006 h
- Geometric albedo: 0.24 (assumed); 0.2456±0.0331; 0.270±0.028; 0.39±0.20
- Spectral type: S
- Absolute magnitude (H): 12.787±0.001 (R) · 12.80 · 12.810±0.080 (R) · 12.9 · 13.00

3031 Houston, provisional designation 1984 CX, is a stony Florian asteroid from the inner regions of the asteroid belt, approximately 6 kilometers in diameter. It was discovered on 8 February 1984, by American astronomer Edward Bowell at Anderson Mesa Station near Flagstaff, Arizona. It was named after American amateur astronomer Walter Scott Houston.

== Orbit and classification ==
Houston is a member of the Flora family (402), a giant asteroid family and the largest family of stony asteroids in the main-belt. It orbits the Sun in the inner main-belt at a distance of 2.0–2.5 AU once every 3 years and 4 months (1,221 days). Its orbit has an eccentricity of 0.10 and an inclination of 4° with respect to the ecliptic.

The body's observation arc begins with its identification as 1954 EF at Goethe Link Observatory in October 1954, or 30 years prior to its official discovery observation at Anderson Mesa.

== Physical characteristics ==
Houston is an assumed S-type asteroid, in line with the Flora family's overall spectral type.

=== Rotation period ===
In April 2011, a rotational lightcurve of Houston was obtained from photometric observations by astronomers at the Oakley Southern Sky Observatory (E09) in Australia. Lightcurve analysis gave a well-defined rotation period of 11.218 hours with a brightness amplitude of 0.11 magnitude (U=3). Two more lightcurves obtained at the Palomar Transient Factory in 2014, gave a period of 5.61 (half the period solution) and 11.175 hours with an amplitude of 0.17 and 0.14 magnitude, respectively (U=2/2).

=== Diameter and albedo ===
According to the survey carried out by the NEOWISE mission of NASA's Wide-field Infrared Survey Explorer, Houston measures between 5.45 and 6.761 kilometers in diameter and its surface has an albedo between 0.2456 and 0.39.

The Collaborative Asteroid Lightcurve Link assumes an albedo of 0.24 – derived from 8 Flora, the largest member and namesake of the Flora family – and calculates a diameter of 7.14 kilometers based on an absolute magnitude of 12.9.

== Naming ==
This minor planet was named after Walter Scott Houston (1912–1993), an American amateur astronomer best known for his column "Deep-Sky Wonders" in the Sky and Telescope magazine. Houston, who observed deep-sky objects, has also encouraged many amateur astronomers.

The name was proposed by the discoverer following a suggestion by P. L. Dombrowski. The official naming citation was published by the Minor Planet Center on 22 June 1986 (M.P.C. 10845).
