= Stellafane =

Observatory in Vermont, US

Stellafane Observatory
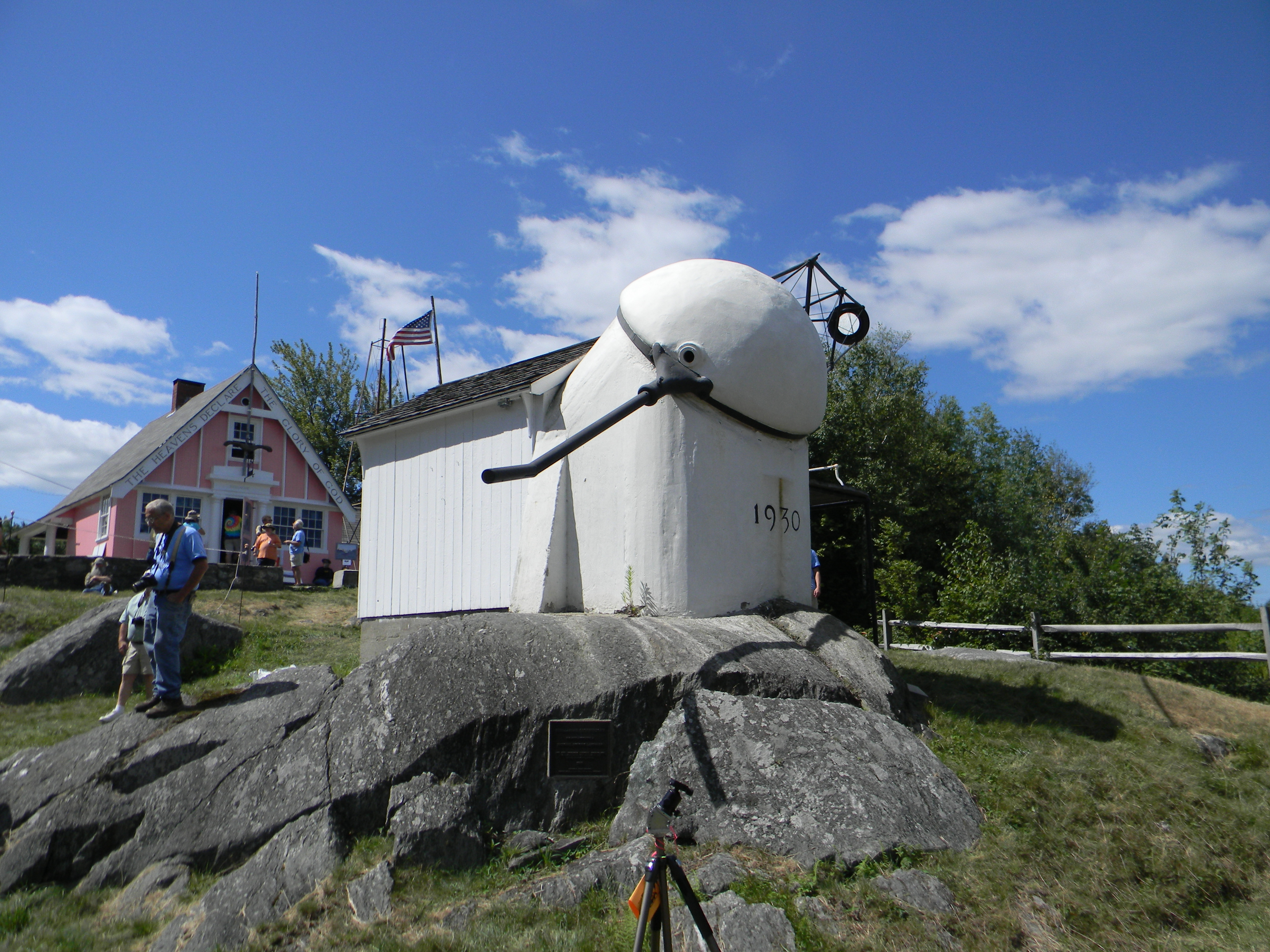
- Alternative names: Springfield Telescope Makers
- Organization: Springfield Telescope Makers
- Location: Springfield, Windsor County, Vermont
- Coordinates: 43°16′42″N 72°31′10″W
- Altitude: 1,290 feet (390 m)
- Weather: Variable weather – clear dark night skies
- Established: August 12, 1920
- Stellafane Observatory
- U.S. National Register of Historic Places
- U.S. National Historic Landmark
- Location within Vermont Location within the United States
- Location: Breezy Hill, Springfield, Vermont
- Area: 3.5 acres (1.4 ha)
- Built: 1923, 1930
- NRHP reference No.: 77000107

Significant dates
- Added to NRHP: 7 November 1977
- Designated NHL: 20 December 1989
- Website: https://www.stellafane.org
- Related media on Commons

The Stellafane Observatory is an astronomical observatory in Springfield, Vermont, founded in 1920 by Russell W. Porter. The Pink Clubhouse was built in 1923 at the site by the Springfield Telescope Makers. The name Stellafane, suggested by Porter at the club's December 1923 meeting, is derived from the Latin words stella and fanum meaning "Shrine to the Stars", and originally referred specifically to the clubhouse, but has since come to refer to all of the club's land and buildings on the summit of Breezy Hill, west of downtown Springfield.

The Stellafane Convention, a gathering of amateur telescope makers and amateur astronomers is the longest running astronomical convention in the United States, having been held nearly every year at the location since 1926. The clubhouse and observatory became listed on the National Register of Historic Places in 1977, and became a National Historic Landmark in 1989, in recognition of the club's pioneering role in the popularization of astronomy and the amateur construction of telescopes.

== History ==
Russell Porter was born in Springfield in 1871, and in 1919, upon returning to the town, began constructing telescopes with the assistance of employees and equipment from the factories in Springfield. The Springfield Telescope Makers Club grew out of an instructional class on how to make telescopes that was started by Porter the following year, on 12 August 1920.

=== Stellafane Clubhouse ===
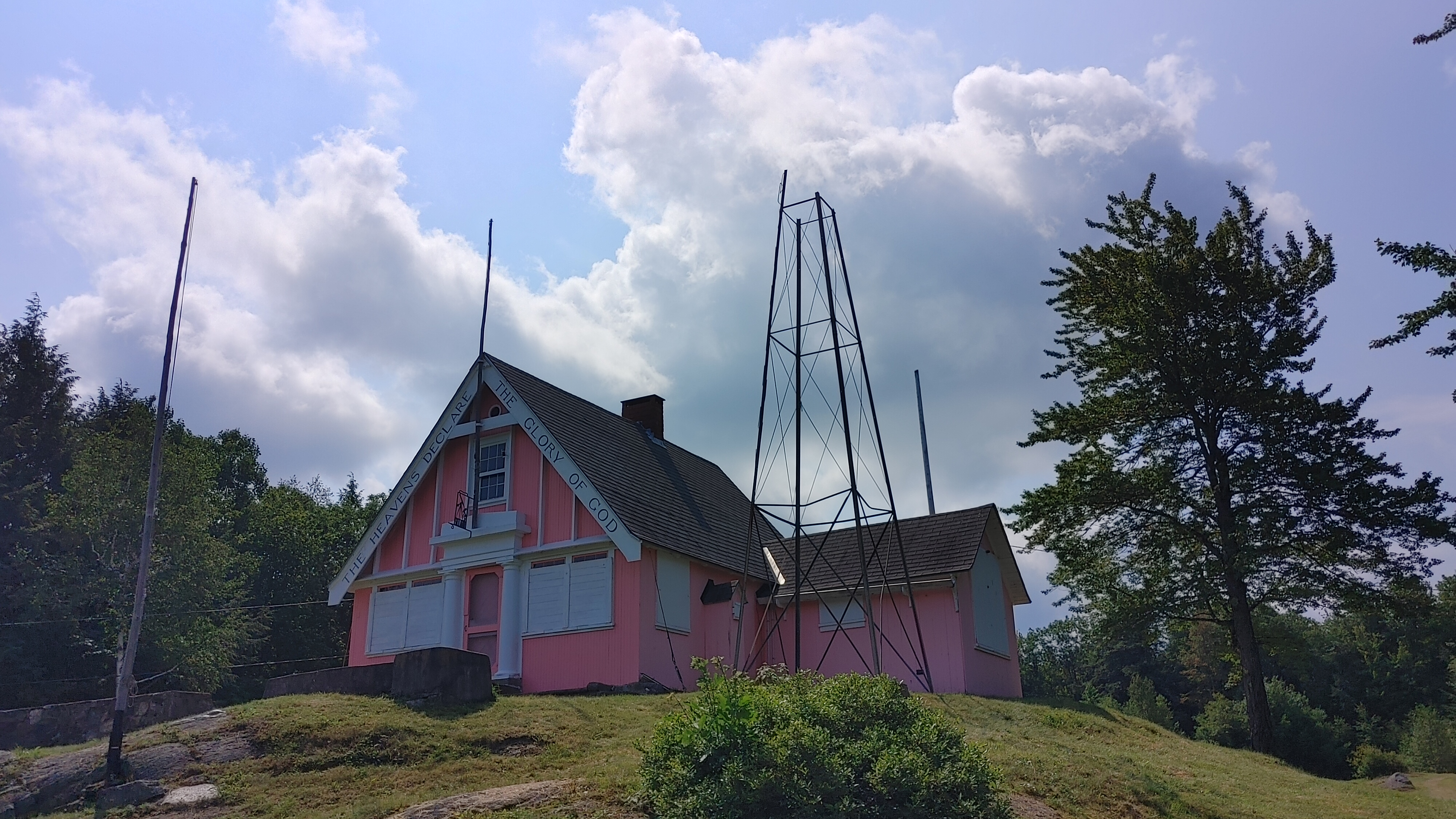
View of the original pink Clubhouse at the Stellafane Observatory (2021).

On December 7, 1923 (102 years ago), the members of this small group held their first meeting, deciding to build a clubhouse on a 3.5-acre (1.4 ha) plot belonging to Porter on the 1,270-foot (390 m) summit of Breezy Hill outside of town.

The original 20-by-24-foot (6.1 by 7.3 m) clubhouse, with an 11-by-13-foot (3.4 by 4.0 m) ell added in 1926, included a meeting room, a kitchen, a workshop, and bunk rooms on the second floor. The building incorporated a polar Cassegrain telescope, a transit telescope (no longer functional), a solar telescope, and a sundial on the south wall.

== Stellafane (Original Site) ==
Besides the historic Stellafane "pink clubhouse", the original site includes Porter's uniquely designed Porter Turret Telescope, a 12-inch (300 mm; 30 cm) f/17 Newtonian reflector built in 1930, consisting of an equatorially rotated concrete dome with the telescope mounted on the outside, with the observer on the inside working in heated comfort.

In 2017, the Simoni Spectrohelioscope Solar Observatory was constructed near the Turret Telescope, named after long-time convention attendee Andrew E. Simoni (1918–2013).

Stellafane West is still the location where the Springfield Telescope Makers hold most of their meetings and telescope competitions.

== Stellafane East ==
Although the amateur telescope competition and display is still held on the original site around the clubhouse, most of the convention activities since the 1980s have taken place at Stellafane East, an annex to the original land about 1/4 mile (400 m) away.

Stellafane East includes the more recent McGregor Observatory, built between 1986 and 1991, which boasts a 13-inch (330 mm; 33 cm) Schupmann telescope, the Breuning Domed Observatory built in the early 2000s, the Flanders Pavilion, built in 2005 and named after founding club member Ernest Flanders, the "Amphitheater" hillside presentation area, the "Bunkhouse", which contains radio communications equipment, and several other buildings on the eastern site.

Over 10 acres (4.0 ha) of land at Stellafane East are reserved as a camping area, with plots for tents, campers, and RVs to reside during the multi-day convention and other gatherings.

== Stellafane Convention ==
The Stellafane Convention is held every year on the club's land and buildings on the summit of Breezy Hill. It was started by Porter and the Springfield Telescope Makers in 1926, as an occasion for some 20 amateur telescope makers to compare telescopes and exchange ideas. It has since become Thousands of amateur telescope makers from all over the world gather to share their innovations, join in competitions, and enjoy the night sky. The convention is generally held over the weekend of the new moon closest to the height of the Perseid meteor shower, usually in early August.

The convention has been held nearly every summer since 1926, with the exceptions of:

- 1949–1953, following the death of founder Russell W. Porter
- 2020, due to the COVID-19 pandemic

The convention has been attended by several notable figures in the fields of astronomy and space exploration, including Alan Bean, David H. Levy, Alan Stern, Clyde Tombaugh, and Samuel D. Hale, grandson of George Ellery Hale.

== See also ==
- 3140 Stellafane, asteroid named after Stellafane
- Amateur telescope making
- Amateur astronomy
- List of astronomical societies
- Star party

Notable amateur astronomers associated with Stellafane

- Robert E. Cox
- James Hartness
- Walter Scott Houston, longtime presenter of the Saturday evening "Shadowgram" talk
- Albert Graham Ingalls, Scientific American editor who wrote stories about Russell W. Porter and the Springfield Telescope Makers
- John M. Pierce, early founding member
- Russell W. Porter, founder of the Springfield Telescope Makers
- List of National Historic Landmarks in Vermont
- National Register of Historic Places listings in Windsor County, Vermont

== Gallery ==
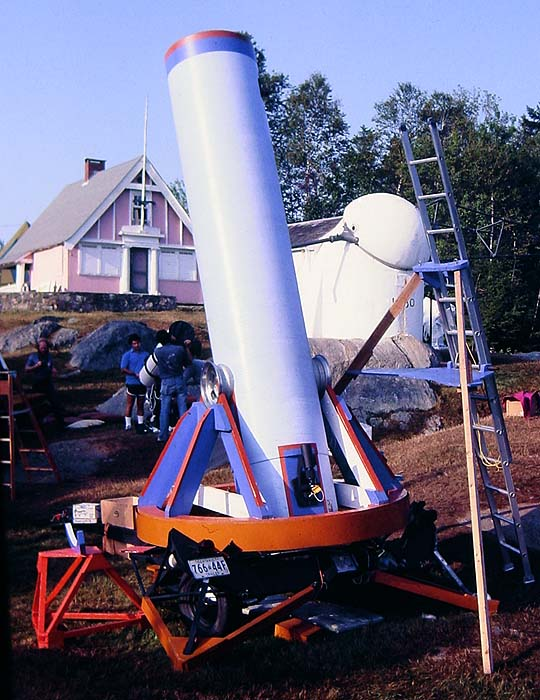
A large trailer mounted newtonian reflector on display during the 1983 Stellafane Convention with the pink Clubhouse and the Porter Turret Telescope in the background

Stellafane presentation at the hillside amphitheater in 1999

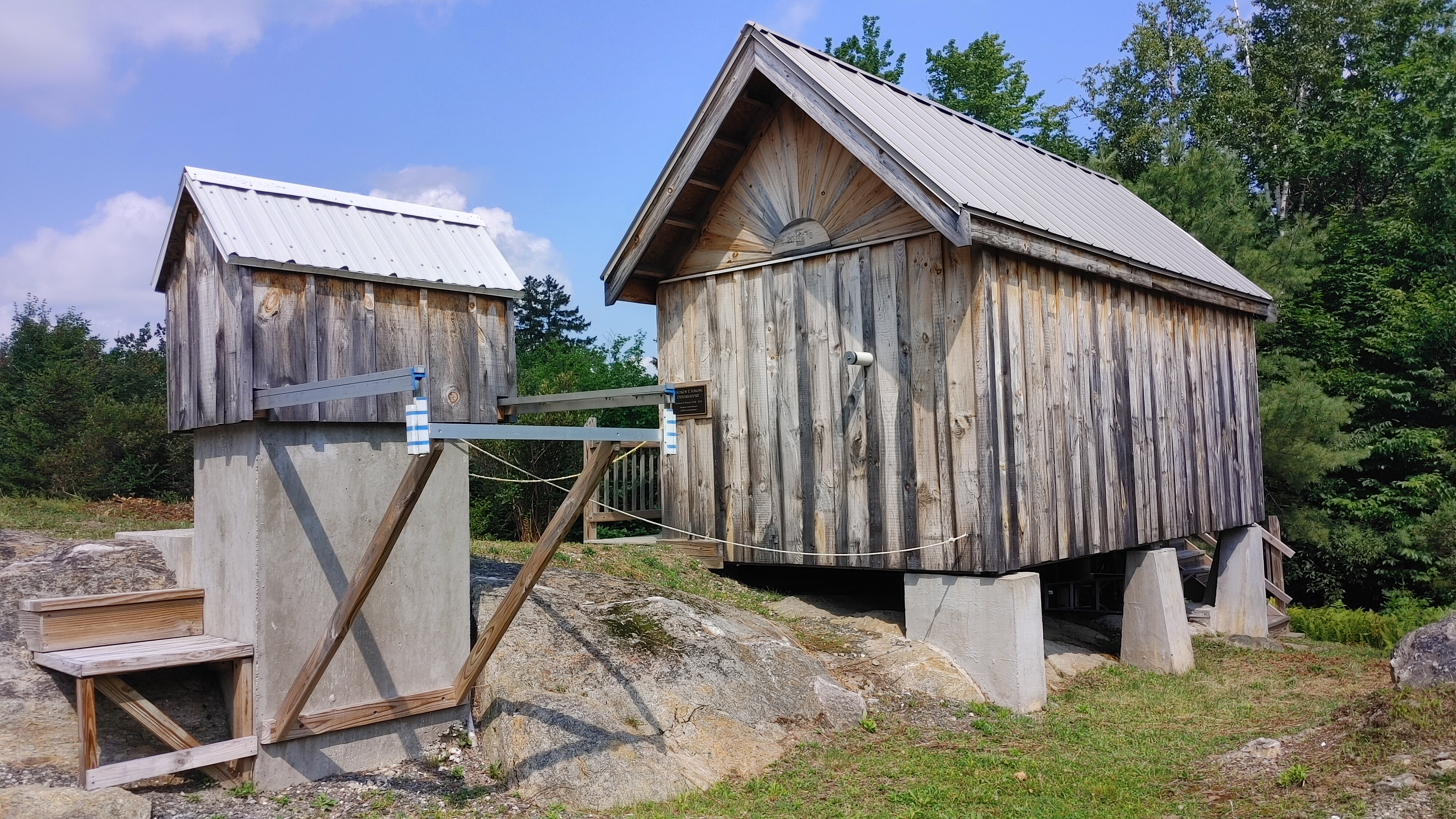
View of the Simoni Spectrohelioscope building at Stellafane West, 2021

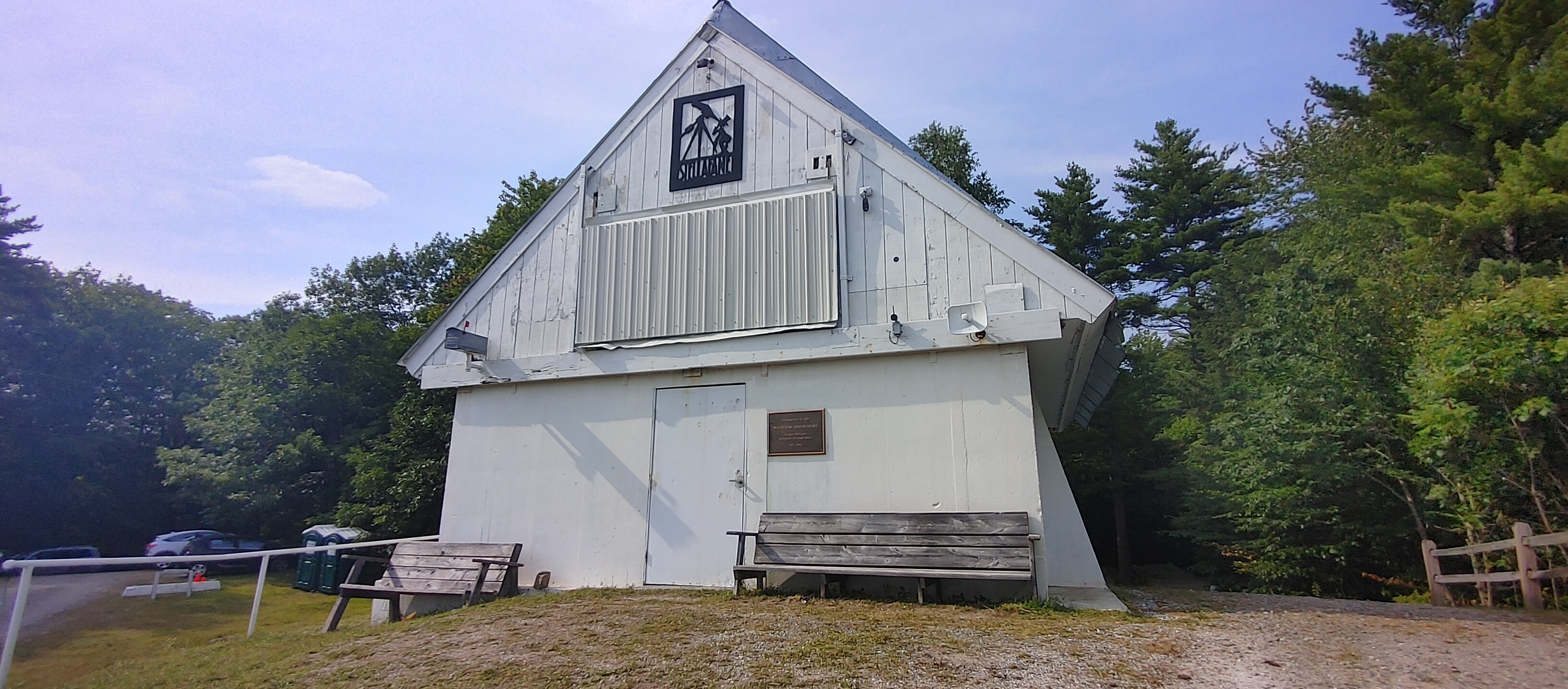
The McGregor Observatory building at Stellafane East

The Stellafane logo on the cornerstone of the McGregor Observatory

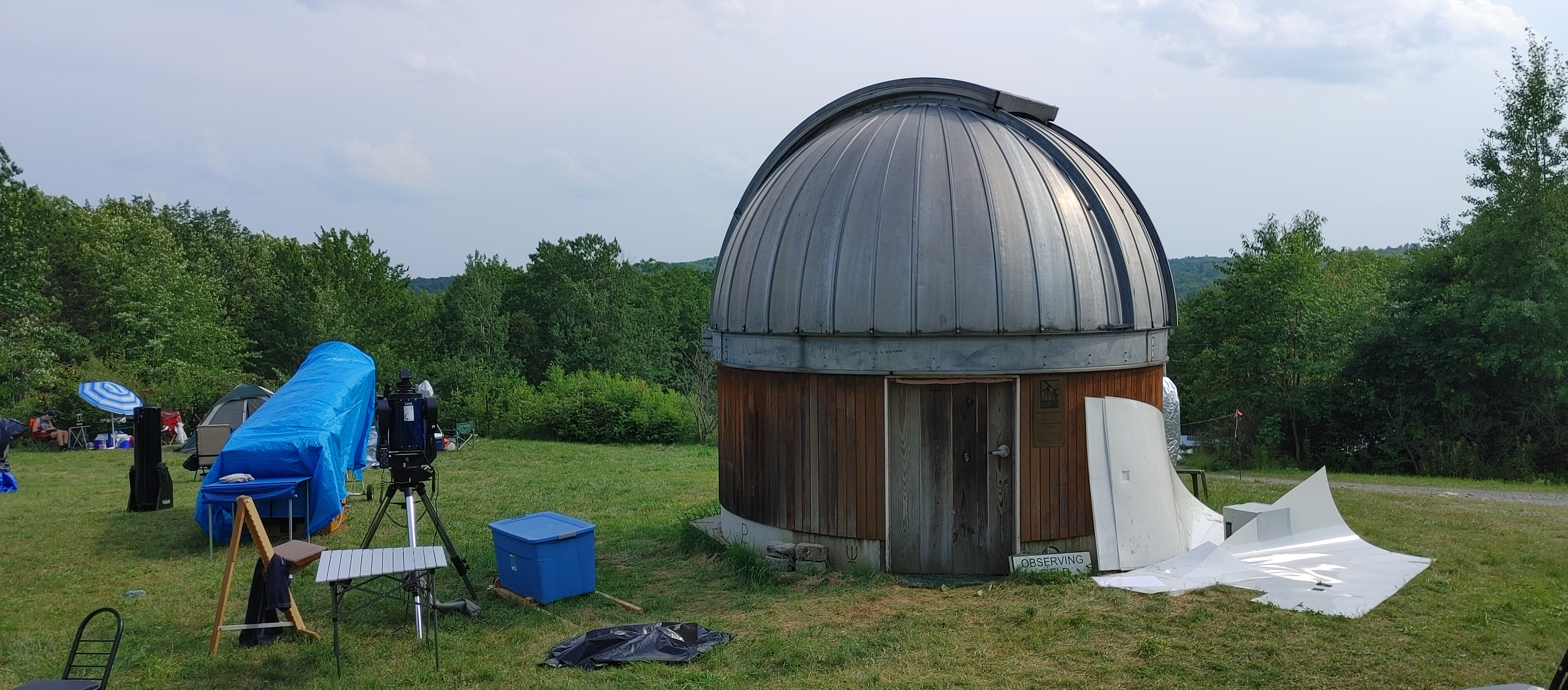
View of the Breuning Domed Observatory at the 2021 Stellafane Convention

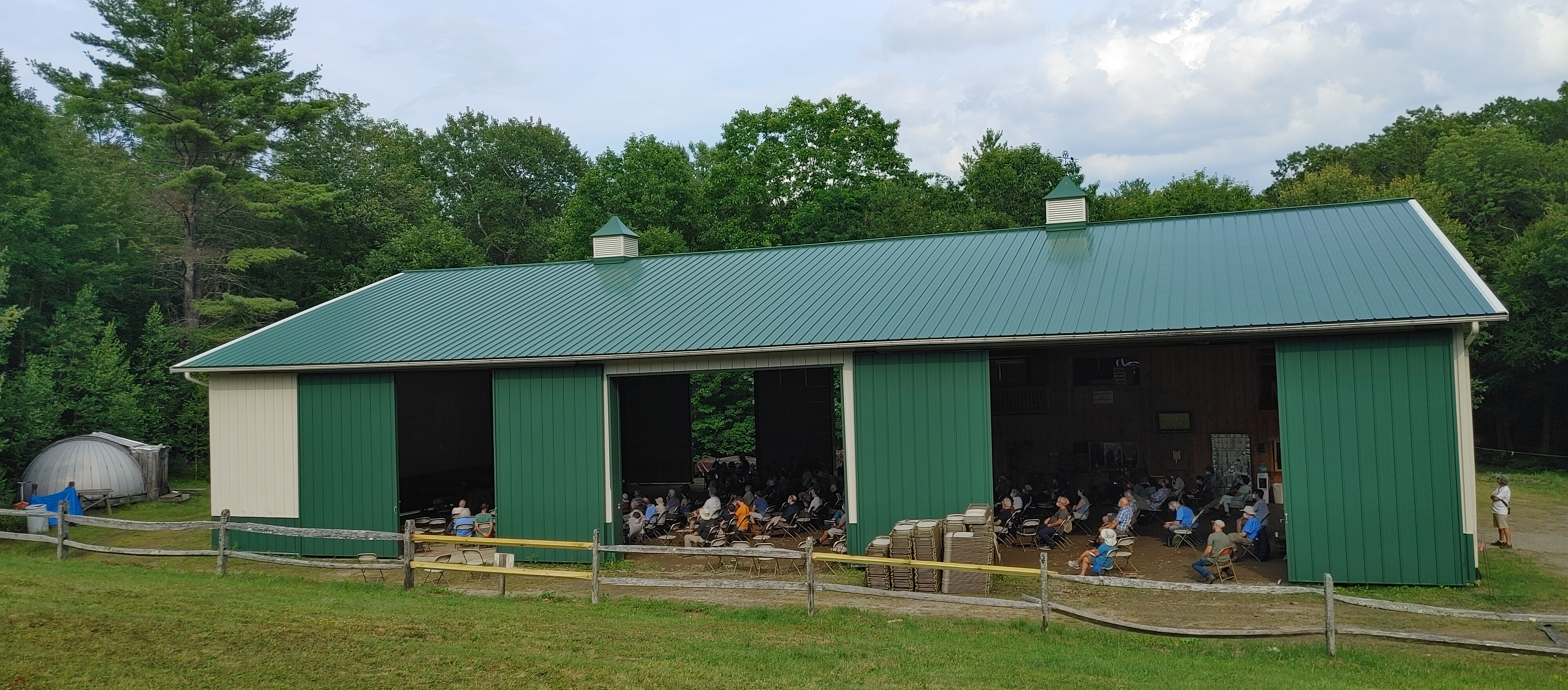
View of the Flanders Pavilion at the 2021 Stellafane Convention
