= Louisville Astronomical Society =

American organization of amateur astronomers

- Abbreviation: LAS
- Founded: October 24, 1933; 93 years ago
- Founder: Walter Lee Moore, James Gilbert Baker, Charles Strull, O. W. McCarty
- Type: Amateur astronomy society
- Tax ID no.: 501(c)(3)
- Legal status: Active
- Purpose: Promoting interest in astronomy and advancing public education in astronomy
- Headquarters: Louisville, Kentucky, U.S.
- Members: 250+
- Parent organization: Astronomical League
- Website: louisville-astro.org

The Louisville Astronomical Society (LAS) is an American amateur astronomy organization based in Louisville, Kentucky. Founded in 1933, it is a charter member of the Astronomical League and one of the oldest continuously operating amateur astronomy societies in the United States. The society operates two observing facilities and conducts public outreach programs for schools, libraries, scout groups, and state parks.

== History ==
=== Founding ===
On March 5, 1933, a group of University of Louisville astronomy students met at the home of their professor, Dr. Walter Lee Moore, to discuss forming an amateur astronomy society in Louisville. That same year, two other groups were independently pursuing astronomy education in the city: Charles Strull was conducting public astronomy programs at the YMCA, and O. W. McCarty was teaching astronomy through the Louisville Council of the Boy Scouts of America. On October 24, 1933, the three groups merged at Moore's home on Finley Hill to formally establish the Louisville Astronomical Society. Among the founding members were James Gilbert Baker, then a student, and his future wife Elizabeth Breitenstein. Moore served as the society's first president, holding the position from 1933 to 1943.

In the winter of 1935–36, the LAS partnered with the University of Louisville's Department of Education to sponsor a series of public astronomy lectures delivered by Moore. Proceeds from ticket sales funded the purchase of glass for constructing a reflecting telescope.

=== Louisville Junior Astronomical Society ===
In 1953, younger members of the LAS formed the Louisville Junior Astronomical Society (LJAS) to serve amateur astronomers between the ages of 12 and 18. Under the sponsorship of Virginia C. Lipphard, who served as LAS president in 1957–58, the junior society flourished for more than 20 years. The LJAS operated an observatory equipped with a 21-inch reflector, hosted three Great Lakes Regional conventions, and conducted more than 200 public programs for schools, churches, and scout groups.

The LJAS produced several notable scientists. In a span of just four years, three LJAS members placed in the prestigious Westinghouse Science Talent Search: Daniel Kleinman finished 3rd in 1962, J. Richard Gott III finished 2nd in 1965, and Larry Goad finished 4th in 1966. Other LJAS alumni include John F. Kielkopf, who became a professor of physics at the University of Louisville, and Edward F. Novak, who became a senior physicist at Mound Laboratories.

Lipphard received the Astronomical League Award, the highest honor the League bestows, in recognition of the outstanding achievements of former junior members at the national and international level.

=== Astronomical League involvement ===
The LAS is a charter member of the Astronomical League, the national federation of over 220 amateur astronomy societies in the United States. Along with the Detroit and Warren Astronomical Society, the LAS was a central figure in the founding of the League's Great Lakes Region in 1954. In 1957, LAS member Louise Kleinman won a book award for suggesting the name Reflector for the League's magazine. In 1962, the LAS hosted a Great Lakes Regional convention at the Kentucky Hotel in Louisville.

Chuck Allen, a past LAS president, served as president of the Astronomical League from 1998 to 2002 and again from 2024 onward. In 1991, while LAS president, Allen co-founded the annual "Stars at the Beach" public observation event at Patoka Lake in Indiana with Scott Conner of the Evansville Astronomical Society.

=== Recent history ===
On October 2, 1993, the LAS celebrated its 60th anniversary with a banquet for over 120 members and supporters at the University of Louisville, featuring talks by J. Richard Gott III and John Kielkopf.

In 2000, the society purchased 40 acres (16 ha) in Curby, Indiana, seeking the darkest sky within an hour's drive of downtown Louisville. The James G. Baker Center for Astronomy Observatory was completed on the site in 2004. The Urban Astronomy Center (UAC) at E. P. "Tom" Sawyer State Park was established in 2007, featuring a classroom, education center, computer lab, and several telescopes for public viewing.

As of the mid-2020s, the society has more than 250 members. It is a 501(c)(3) nonprofit organization staffed entirely by volunteers. Over its more than 90 years of existence, thousands have participated in the organization's outreach programs; in 1993, more than 3,000 people attended a meteor-viewing event in Long Run Park.

== Facilities ==
The LAS operates two primary observing sites:

- The James G. Baker Center for Astronomy (also known as "Curby"), located on 40 acres (16 ha) near Curby, Indiana (38°16′26.68″N 86°24′52.50″W). Named for founding member James Gilbert Baker, the observatory was completed in 2004 and provides dark-sky conditions for deep-sky observing.
- The Urban Astronomy Center (UAC), located at E. P. "Tom" Sawyer State Park in Louisville (38°16′49.66″N 85°33′28.81″W). Established in 2007, it serves as the society's primary venue for monthly public star parties held from March through November.

The society also conducts observing events at Bernheim Forest, the Parklands of Floyds Fork, Blackacre State Nature Preserve, and the Big Four Bridge.

== Notable members ==
- James Gilbert Baker (1914–2005) – founding member and first vice president; went on to become a pioneering optical designer responsible for cameras used on the U-2 spy plane and SR-71 Blackbird, the Baker-Schmidt telescope, and the optics for the Polaroid SX-70 camera. He held more than 50 U.S. patents and was a Fellow of the Optical Society of America and the National Academy of Sciences.
- J. Richard Gott III (born 1947) – president of the LJAS 1964–65; became professor of astrophysics at Princeton University, known for solving Einstein field equations for cosmic strings and co-discovering the Sloan Great Wall. Received the 1998 Astronomical League Award.
- Chuck Allen – LAS president (1991) who went on to serve as president of the Astronomical League (1998–2002, 2024–present).

== See also ==
- List of astronomical societies
- Astronomical League
