= Albert Ingalls =

Albert Ingalls may refer to:

- Albert Graham Ingalls (1888–1958), American scientific editor and amateur astronomer
- Albert Quinn Ingalls, a fictional character from the television series Little House on the Prairie
