= Walter Scott Houston =

American astronomer (1912–1993)

- Houston at the 1983 Stellafane Convention
- Born: May 30, 1912; Tippecanoe, Wisconsin, U.S.
- Died: December 23, 1993 (aged 81); Cancún, Mexico
- Education: University of Wisconsin
- Occupations: English teacher, editor
- Employer: American Education Publications

Walter Scott Houston (May 30, 1912 – December 23, 1993) was an American popularizer of amateur astronomy. He wrote the "Deep-Sky Wonders" column in Sky and Telescope magazine from 1946 to 1993.

== Biography ==
Houston was born in Tippecanoe, Wisconsin, in 1912. He attended the University of Wisconsin where he earned a degree in English. After graduating, he taught at universities and public schools in Wisconsin, Ohio, Alabama, Kansas, Missouri and Connecticut. During World War II he was an instructor at the Advanced Navigation School for Army-Air Force pilots at Selman Field in Louisiana. In 1960 he moved to Connecticut where he became an editor for American Education Publications. He remained in this position until his retirement in 1974.

== Contributions to amateur astronomy ==
As a boy, Houston learned to build microscopes and telescopes and developed an interest in amateur astronomy. He soon observed all 103 nebulae and star clusters in the Messier catalog. While at the University of Wisconsin he began observing variable stars and in 1931 he joined the American Association of Variable Star Observers (AAVSO). Eventually, he contributed more than 12,000 variable star observations to AAVSO.

While living in Kansas in the 1950s, Houston undertook radio monitoring of meteor activity. His group operated the first automated data collection system designed by amateurs for continuous, long-term collection of meteor event data. The same method forms the basis for most forward scatter automated detection systems used today, although other methods are available.

In 1955, Houston recruited a few dozen people as satellite spotters for Operation Moonwatch. In 1958, his Moonwatch station in Manhattan, Kansas, was the first to catch sight of Explorer I, the United States' first satellite.

Houston was active in raising funds for the project, by giving talks about satellite watching and asking for contributions. He was so successful that the president of Kansas State University included Houston's team in his annual science research summary, and the Physics Department donated equipment to the group.

Houston is best known for the "Deep-Sky Wonders" column which he wrote for Sky & Telescope which popularized the observing of deep sky objects. His final column appeared in 1994, the year after his death. He also published a regional newsletter called The Great Plains Observer that was circulated to several thousand amateur astronomers.

== Mars moon hoax ==
In 1959, Houston perpetrated a celebrated April Fool's hoax when he included an article in the April edition of the Great Plains Astronomical Society journal:

Just last week Dr. Arthur Hayall of the University of the Sierras reports that the moons of Mars are actually artificial satellites... They are truly space stations in the most elaborate sense of the word... even though the race that flung them so magnificently into orbit may be dead and gone, they still orbit as the greatest monument to intelligent accomplishment yet known to mankind.

Both Dr. Hayall and the University of the Sierras were fictitious.

The hoax soon gained worldwide attention in May 1959 when a similar theory was proposed by Soviet scientist Iosif Shklovsky in an interview with Komsomol Pravda. Gerard Kuiper of the Yerkes Observatory was quoted as saying about Shklovsky, "He is much too brilliant to believe such nonsense."

== Honors ==
The main-belt asteroid 3031 Houston, discovered by Edward Bowell at Anderson Mesa Station in 1984, was named in his honor. The Walter Scott Houston Award of the North East Region Astronomical League, was also named after him. In 1974 he was the recipient of the Astronomical League Award at the National A.L. Meeting in East Lansing, Michigan where he was also the main speaker.

== Books by Houston ==
- Deep-Sky Wonders, a collection of his columns from Sky & Telescope.
