= Society for Amateur Scientists =

The Society for Amateur Scientists (SAS) was a non-profit 501(c)(3) organization dedicated to "helping ordinary people do extraordinary science". It was the first organization ever created for the generalists of citizen science. Rather than supporting a narrow interest, such as amateur astronomy or archeology, SAS supported amateur research into all fields of science and in so doing, it helped to launch the modern citizen science movement.

== History ==
The Society for Amateur Scientists was the brainchild of Shawn Carlson, Ph.D., a physicist from the University of California, Berkeley's Center for Particle Astrophysics. Inspired by the example of his grandfather, a gifted amateur scientist named George Donald Graham, Carlson founded SAS in San Diego, California on January 1, 1994. Members of the founding Board of Trustees included Nobel Prize winner Glenn Seaborg and Guggenheim Fellowship winner Paul MacCready. Dr. Carlson led the organization for 16 years until he closed it to pursue other interests in science education.

In 1995, Scientific American magazine tapped Carlson, due to his leadership in the citizen scientist community, to write their long running column The Amateur Scientist. During the six years that Carlson wrote this column, SAS grew to a reported 2,000 members. In 1999, the MacArthur Foundation recognized Carlson for his visionary leadership in creating SAS with a MacArthur Fellowship in science education.

SAS provided a number of services to citizen scientists. The organization published an ezine called The Citizen Scientist (TCS) which delivered how-to science content as well as reports of citizen scientist research. In July 2008 the Chicago Tribune named "The Citizen Scientist" one of their five favorite science magazines. SAS hosted annual conferences in various cities around the United States. It ran a community website to promote networking between citizen scientists around the world. It had a number of local chapters and affiliate organizations. SAS also provided educational services to young researchers. The organization raised over one million dollars in support of citizen science.

In December, 2008 Discover Magazine named three SAS members–Forrest Mims, Ely Silk and Bill Hilton–to be amongst the "50 Best Brains In Science".

In June 2010 Dr. Carlson closed the organization to shift his professional focus entirely to youth education when he founded the LabRats Science Education Program. The web domain for SAS, sas.org, was sold. A new domain, soamsci.org, was created to hold the final SAS web site and the complete archive of TCS articles. As of December 2020, Dr. Carlson continues to support the amateur scientist community through the Society for Amateur Scientists Facebook page.
