= Russell W. Porter =

American artist, astronomer, and explorer

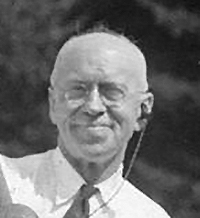
- Porter, c. 1940
- Born: December 13, 1871; Springfield, Vermont, US
- Died: February 22, 1949 (aged 77); Pasadena, California, US
- Resting place: South Parish Cemetery, Tenants Harbor, Maine, US
- Known for: Amateur Telescope Making
- Spouse: Alice Belle Marshall (married 1907)
- Children: 2
- Honours: Porter (lunar crater) Porter B (lunar crater) Porter C (lunar crater) Porter (martian crater) 329069 Russellporter (asteroid)

Russell Williams Porter (December 13, 1871 – February 22, 1949) was an American artist, engineer, architect, cartographer, amateur astronomer, and Arctic explorer. He was a pioneer in the field of cutaway drawing and is sometimes referred to as the "founder of amateur telescope making."

== Biography ==
Russell W. Porter, the youngest of five children, was born in 1871 in Springfield, Vermont. His parents were Frederick and Caroline Porter. Russell showed an early aptitude for art. He graduated from Vermont Academy in 1891 and went on to study engineering at Norwich University and at the University of Vermont and later studied architecture and art at the Massachusetts Institute of Technology. As a young architect he designed at least one building, the Springfield Town Library in his hometown. He designed this with assistance from Willard P. Adden, an experienced architect in the office of Charles Brigham. The building was built in the Renaissance Revival style on a Beaux-Arts plan, typical of MIT teachings.

=== Arctic exploration ===
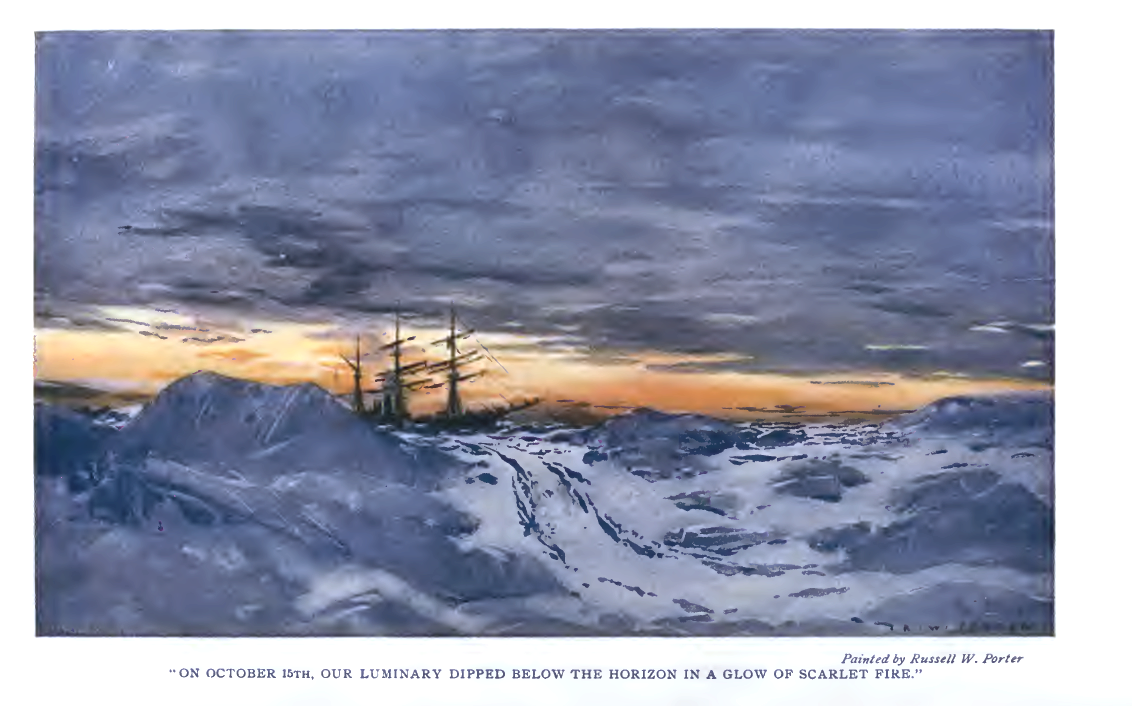
"On October 15, Our Luminary dipped below the horizon in a glow of scarlet fire," painting by Russell W. Porter

Porter became interested in the arctic when he attended Robert Peary's lectures on Greenland in 1892. He signed up to sail on the ship Miranda as surveyor and artist for Frederick Cook's voyage to Greenland that next year. The voyage ended with the ship colliding with an iceberg and the crew being rescued by Inuit. Porter continued travel to the arctic with Peary and Greenland again in 1896, to Baffin Island in 1897, with the Yukon gold rush in 1898, to Labrador in 1899, and northern Greenland in 1900.

Porter was in charge of astronomical observations on the Ziegler Polar Expeditions financed by New York businessman William Ziegler in 1901 and 1903. The second expedition was stranded in the arctic for 3 years when their ship, the Steam Yacht America, was crushed by the ice and sank in Teplitz Bay of Rudolf Island in the Russian arctic. In 1906 Porter again joined Frederick Cook in an expedition to Alaska's Denali. Porter's party surveyed a 3,000-square-mile (7,800 km^{2}) region around the mountain (including painting a watercolor of the mountain) while Cook's party broke off to climb the mountain. When the parties rendezvoused, Porter was skeptical of Cook's claims that he climbed the mountain.

=== Port Clyde, Maine years ===
After his arctic adventures, Porter settled down in Port Clyde, Maine where he tried to start an art colony at Land's End but failed. He built rental cottages, and tried farming. There he married Alice Marshall, the postmistress. Caroline, a daughter, was born in 1912. He also took up astronomy and the hobby of telescope making. He was encouraged by his friend back in Springfield, fellow amateur astronomer and telescope builder James Hartness. In 1913, Hartness sent Porter some telescope building ideas and literature along with two 16-inch-diameter glass blanks. Porter used these to build 16-inch (410 mm) "polar reflector" that he incorporated into the roof of a den he added on to his house in a design that allowed him to observe the sky from indoor heated comfort during long Maine winters. Porter wrote an article about his design for the May 1916 issue of Popular Astronomy. Also in 1913, using field stones from walls that crisscrossed Land's End, Porter and one other man built his stone guesthouse in the style of a castle complete with a circular room and square tower, calling it Fieldstone Castle. In 1915, Porter returned to MIT as a professor of architecture. He worked for the National Bureau of Standards producing prisms and experimenting with the silvering of mirrors during World War I.

== Springfield and Stellafane ==
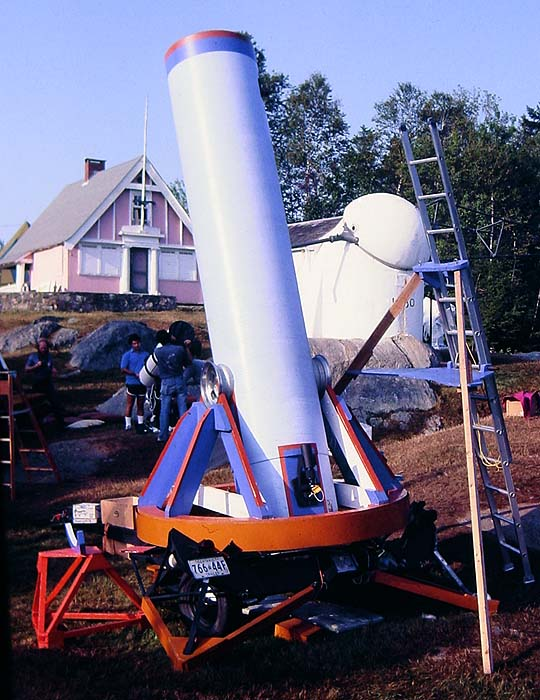
A telescope on display during a 1980s Stellafane Convention, with the "pink clubhouse" and Porter's Turret Telescope in the background

Porter moved back to Springfield, Vermont in 1919 to work at the Jones & Lamson Machine Company, of which James Hartness was president. There he helped Hartness to produce an optical comparator, an instrument for accurately checking the pitch, form, and lead of screw threads. He also designed for this company The Porter Garden Telescope, an innovative ornamental telescope for the garden.

=== Springfield Telescope Makers ===
In August 1920, with the help of Hartness, Porter started a class on how to make telescopes. Fifteen people signed up for that class; 14 men, most of whom were workers from Jones & Lamson, and one woman, a school teacher. Porter showed them how to make Newtonian reflectors, teaching all the aspects of mirror making including grinding, polishing, and testing their own mirrors, and designing and constructing telescope mounts. The members of this small group decided to form an astronomical club and December 7, 1923, was the first meeting of the Springfield Telescope Makers. Soon after, they built a clubhouse on a 30-acre (120,000 m^{2}) plot belonging to Porter on Breezy Hill outside of town. They called the clubhouse Stellafane, Latin for shrine to the stars. The Springfield Telescope Makers invited other groups of stargazers to their clubhouse in 1926, to compare telescopes and exchange ideas. From this small meeting was born the annual event called “Stellafane”, an event that goes on to this day.

In 1925 Albert G. Ingalls featured Porter and the Springfield Telescope Makers in two articles he wrote for Scientific American magazine. The articles contained a great deal of material and illustrations contributed by Porter. There was so much public interest, a regular column, "The Back Yard Astronomer" (later to become The Amateur Scientist column) was started by Ingalls with Porter being a contributing editor. Much of the information from the articles published by Ingalls and Scientific American in the books Amateur Telescope Making (Vols. 1–3), a work that has been referred to as "the bible of telescope making", helped to create lasting public interest in observational astronomy.

== Working on the Hale Telescope ==
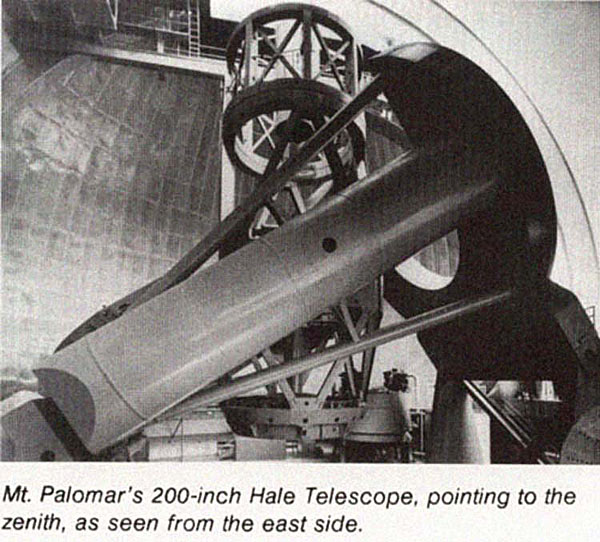
The 200 inch Hale telescope at Mount Palomar

In 1927, at Ingalls suggestion, George Ellery Hale recruited Porter to work on the design of what was then to be the largest telescope on earth, the 200-inch (5,100 mm) Hale Telescope at Palomar Observatory. Porter moved to Pasadena in December 1928 to work as an associate in optics and instrument design. During the conceptual development of the telescope Porter produced extremely detailed cutaway drawings that were noted for their precision and beauty. Porter's designs were vital to success of the large telescope, which was completed in 1948.

Russell W. Porter died in 1949 of a heart attack at the age of 77. The crater Porter on the Moon and the crater Porter on Mars are named in his honor.

== See also ==
- Stellafane Observatory
- Griffith Observatory, designed by Russell W. Porter
- John M. Pierce

== External links and references ==
Biographies

- The legacy of the cutaway man Russell Porter bio at memagazine.org
- Willard, Berton C.(1976). Russell W. Porter Arctic Explorer Artist Telescope Maker, p. 105. The Bond Wheelwright Company, Freeport, Maine.ISBN 0-87027-168-7
- Russell W. Porter – Short biography
- The Telescope Makers of Springfield, Vermont A 1923 article by Porter
- A Brief History of Stellafane by Bert Willard

Art – illustrations

- The National Archives – The Arctic Sketches of Russell W. Porter
- Russell W. Porter Mt. Palomar drawings
- Masters of Cutaway Illustration – Russell W. Porter (1871–1949) Cutaway Drawings, by Kevin Hulsey

Miscellaneous

- Porter (crater on Mars) (photo)
- Hartness Underground Workshop and Hartness-Porter Museum
- south-pole.com ARCTIC CHRONOLOGY – Ziegler Polar Expeditions
- The Papers of Russell William Porter at Dartmouth College Library
