= The Porter Garden Telescope =

Ornamental telescope for the garden

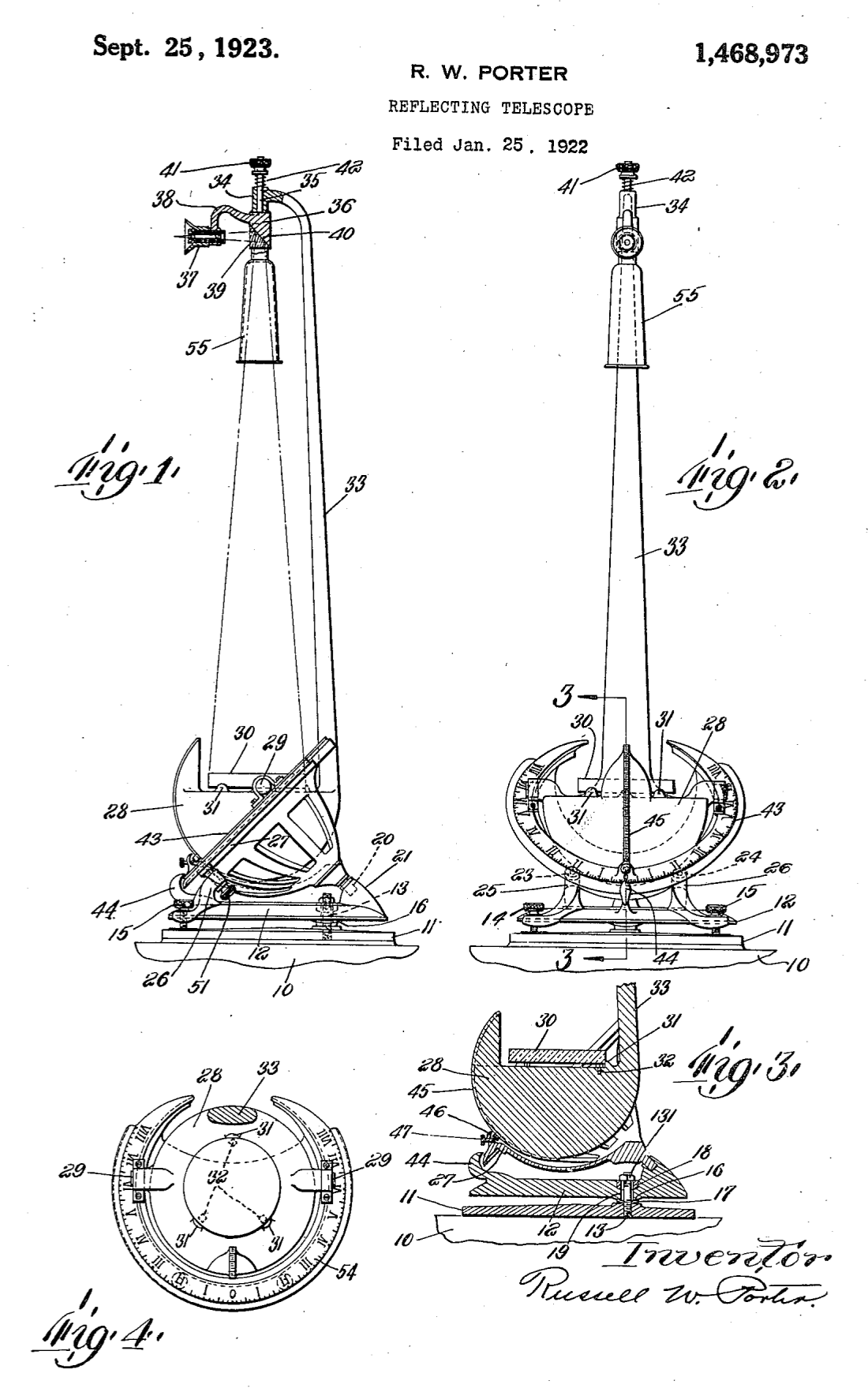
Patent US1468973 of The Porter Garden Telescope (reflector version) by Russell W. Porter

The Porter Garden Telescope was an innovative ornamental telescope for the garden designed by Russell W. Porter and commercialized by Jones & Lamson Machine Company at the beginning of the 1920s in the United States.

Oriented to users with high purchasing power, and constructed in statuary bronze, it could be left permanently outdoors like sculptures and sundials, keeping the delicate optics in a case.

It was embellished with floral ornament, with a style close to the art nouveau. In its base were the names of celebrated astronomers: Galileo, Kepler, and Newton.

The part called the bowl bore the commercial logo "The Porter Garden Telescope", the name and address of the manufacturer, the serial number of manufacture, and the number and date of the patent.

== Technical characteristics ==
- Material of construction: Bronze.

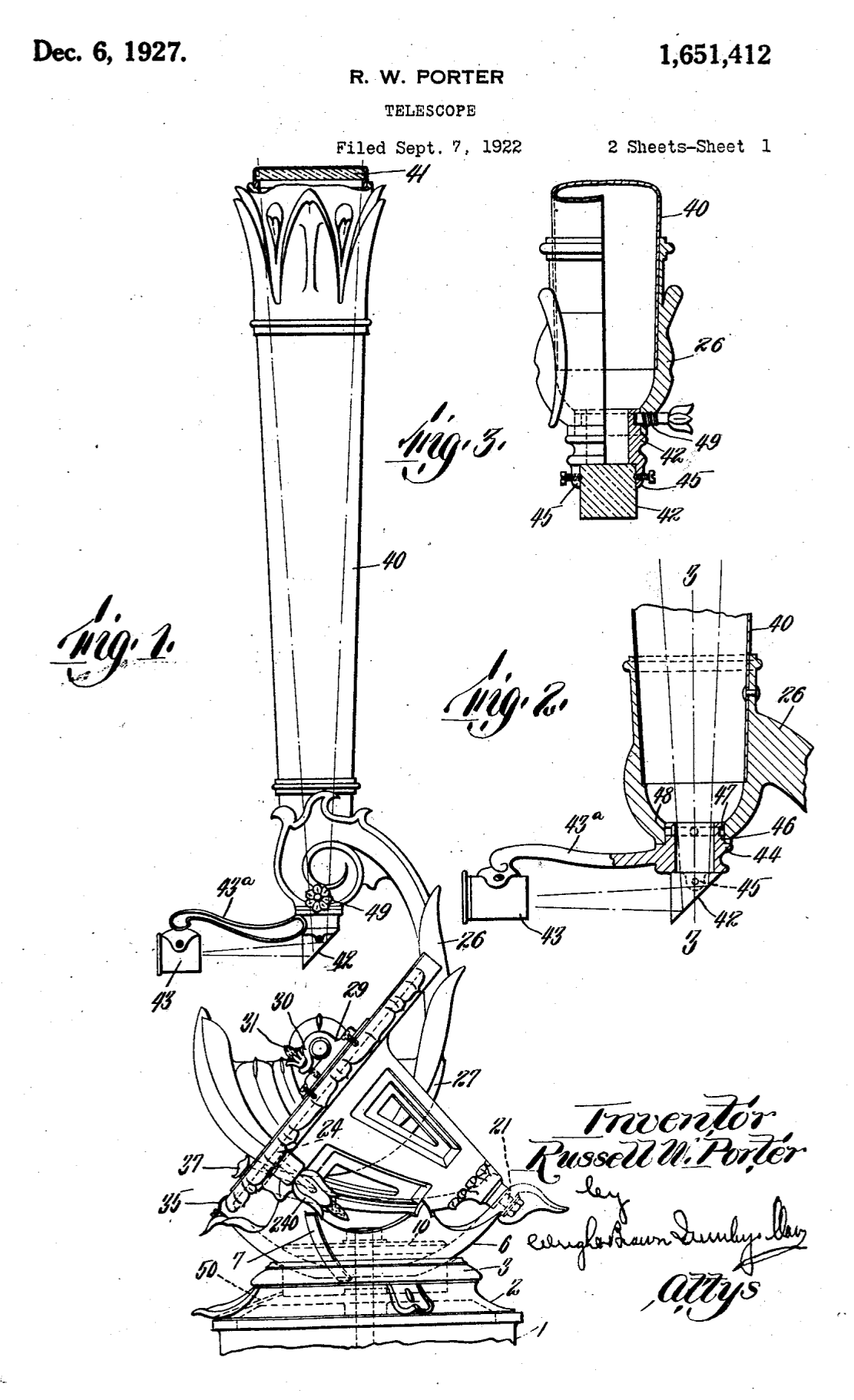
Patent US1651412 (pag.1) of The Porter Garden Telescope (refractor version) by Russell W. Porter

- Reflecting telescope, Newtonian type.
- Without tube that wrap the optics.
- Mount: Combination of altazimuth (terrestrial use) and equatorial type horseshoe (astronomical use).
- Able to follow the movement of the apparent place of the stars, when it is used between the latitudes 25º-55º of both hemispheres north and south.
- Primary mirror of 6 inches (6": roughly 152mm).
- Focal relation f/4.
- Prism of 1.5 inches as secondary reflecting element.
- The eyepieces provided give magnifications of 25x, 50x and 100x.
- The arm that holds the eyepiece spins freely around the optical axis, allowing the user to adapt it to his comfort during the observation.
- Optional: Dual eyepiece holder for simultaneous use of two users.

== History ==
Russell W. Porter designed the telescope starting from previous concepts that he had explored before, with the idea of simplifying and reducing to the minimum the times of transport, assembly, setup and disassembly of conventional personal telescopes. By making a telescope that could stay outdoors permanently, he maximized observing time. On the other hand, it brought together his dream of promoting astronomy among the uninitiated, by embellishing its form to make it attractive to the public, but without endangering the robustness of bronze. Beginners could manipulate it without fear.

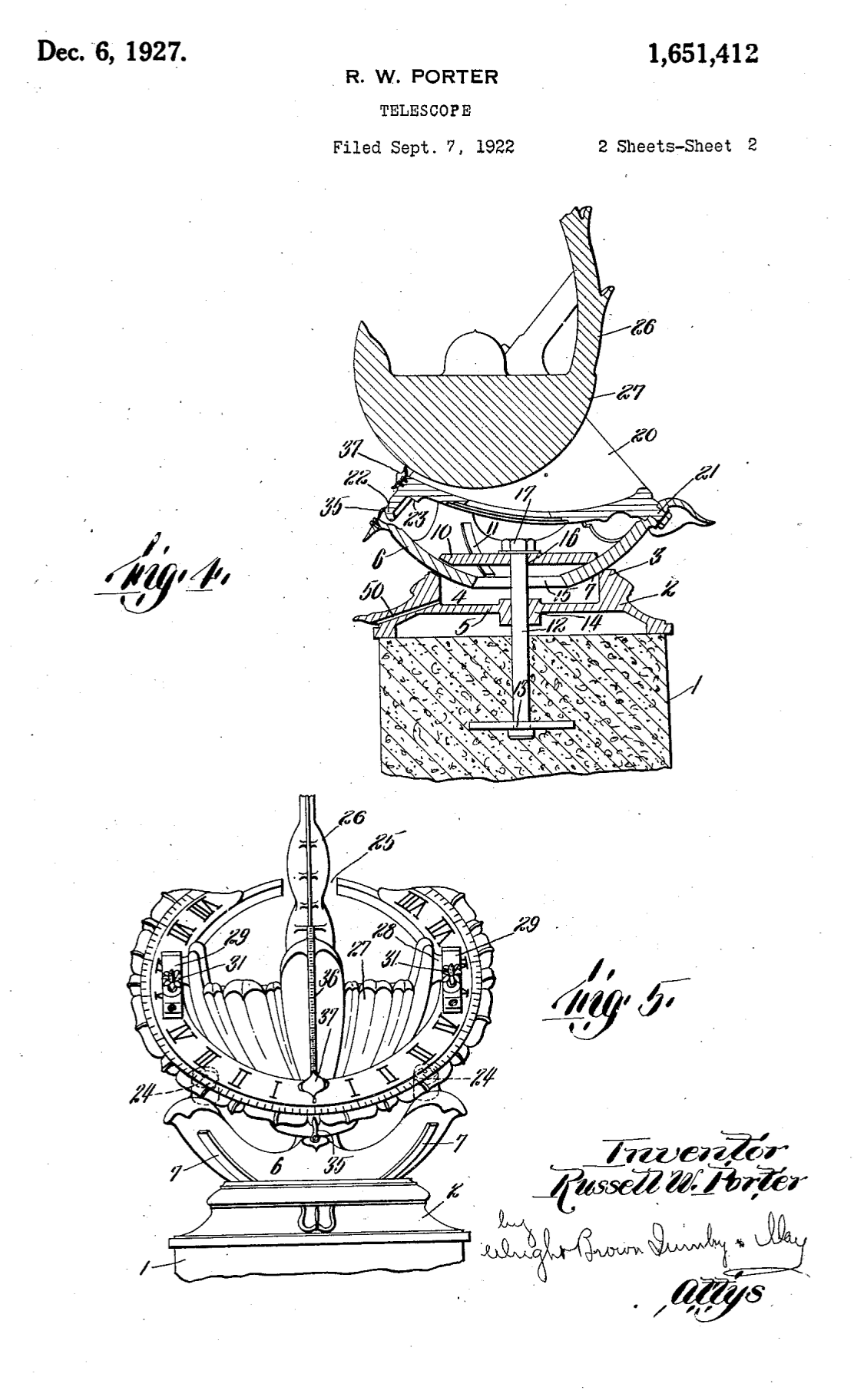
Patent US1651412 (pag.2) of The Porter Garden Telescope (refractor version) by Russell W. Porter

He presented the application of patent on 25 January 1922 and was conceded the same on 25 September 1923 under number US1468973. However, the final model differed of the aforementioned patent in the zone of the base, since there were later modifications of design that were collected in a new patent for a refracting telescope version. Although it presented the application some months after the first, 7 September 1922, it was conceded years later, on 6 December 1927 under number US1651412 but it was never manufactured.

The primary mirror was mechanized by J&L.Mac.Co, with the final parabolized handmade, and the specular surface of the glass was obtained by silvering. They offered to resilver at nominal cost, although they claimed that it would not be necessary to do it in years since its lacquer was tested outdoors during the rigour of one winter of Vermont without appreciating deterioration.

The rest of the optics, prism and ocular, were supplied by John A. Brashear Co. The selection of a prism like a secondary element was usual in the period, previous to the first aluminized optics in vacuum chambers, and deleted the need of maintenance of a second silvering specular surface.

It was commercialized during a pair of years (1923-1924), with the publication of articles in skilled press and announcements in magazines of decoration and gardening, but since its price without pedestal was equal to a car Ford Model-T of the time, that saturated the market for which it was oriented with the sale of around 100 units. Other influential factors in the decommission of the product were: the few customer understanding of how to use the equatorial mount for astronomical use, initial underestimation of the costs of production (sale price changed from $250 to $400) and the own art nouveau style of the sculpture in full tendency of the art deco style.

Years later, in 1936, during the collaboration of Russell W. Porter in the design of the Palomar Observatory and the Hale Telescope, which was the largest effective telescope in the world during 45 years, he requested the assignment of using the original patent to J&L.Mac.Co. to be able to implement the horseshoe type mount in that project, obtaining it without obstacles.

== Miscellanea ==
- On 10 September 1923 Russell W. Porter could show to his acquaintances the partial eclipse of sun, using the sundial function of the telescope and taking advantage to be able to spin freely the arm that held the eyepiece around the optical axis to project comfortably the image of the sun on a cardboard.
- On 29 June 1925 one copy survived to the earthquake of Santa Barbara, showing its profit like sundial since the clocks stopped affected by the seism.
- Exactly ten years after its original presentation in the magazine Scientific American, in 1933 in that magazine an only announcement in which they offered copies manufactured by Donald Alden Patch was published . Don Patch, acquaintance of Russell W. Porter and also member of Springfield Telescope Makers, had already made previously a Springfield type mount making the castings from the original design of Mr. Porter and maybe could have access to molds of the discontinued telescope. It is unknown how many of those could make or sell, but it exists proof of at least a possible copy that amalgamated pieces apparently genuine and parts adapted and re-designed to obtain a functional telescope that reminded the original.
- The copy with higher numbering that has survived until the present and that it has transcended publicly is the number 54. It was exposed in Longwood Gardens and was re-discovered in 2012 under the staircase of a barn.

== See also ==
- List of The Porter Garden Telescope original copies
- Russell W. Porter
- Palomar Observatory
