= Amateur Telescope Making =

- Fourth edition cover, Book One
- Volumes: Amateur Telescope Making; Amateur Telescope Making - Advanced; Amateur Telescope Making - Book Three
- Author: Albert G. Ingalls
- Country: United States
- Language: English
- Genre: Amateur astronomy
- Publisher: Scientific American, Inc.
- Published: 1935, 1958
- Media type: Print (Hardback)

Amateur Telescope Making (ATM) is a series of three books edited by Albert G. Ingalls between 1926 and 1953 while he was an associate editor at Scientific American. The books cover various aspects of telescope construction and observational technique, sometimes at quite an advanced level, but always in a way that is accessible to the intelligent amateur. The caliber of the contributions is uniformly high and the books have remained in constant use by both amateurs and professionals.

The first volume was essentially a reprinting of articles written by Ingalls and Russell W. Porter for Ingalls's monthly column "The Backyard Astronomer" (later "The Amateur Scientist") in the 1920s. It also featured numerous drawings by Porter. The two later volumes contained chapters written by James Gilbert Baker, George Ellery Hale, George Willis Ritchey and others on topics ranging from lens grinding to monochromators to photoelectric photometry. Much of the information, including Porter's articles on the Springfield mount and Franklin Wright's and Henry E. Paul's articles on the design and construction of Schmidt cameras, appeared for the first and only time in these books.

The ATM books are widely credited with having initiated the amateur telescope making movement in the United States. They are often referred to collectively as the "bible" of amateur telescope making.

== Origins ==
Shortly after joining the editorial staff at Scientific American in 1923, Ingalls happened to see an article by Russell Porter in Popular Astronomy magazine describing the work of "The Telescope Makers of Springfield, Vermont." Ingalls contacted Porter, who arranged a visit to New York. Porter convinced Ingalls to use Scientific American as a platform for "spreading the telescope making virus."

The first article appeared in November 1925; in it, Ingalls wrote that if there was a strong enough response from readers, he would write a follow-up article with instructions for making a mirror and mounting for a simple telescope. Nearly a thousand letters were received, and Ingalls and Porter collaborated on two more articles which appeared in February and March 1926. A fourth article in April 1926 contained a simpler treatment of telescope making by John M. Pierce of the Springfield Telescope Makers.

The first edition of ATM appeared in 1926. It contained 102 pages, and consisted of the two Porter articles plus extensive extracts from a 1920 book, The Amateur's Telescope, by Irish astronomer Rev. W. F. A. Ellison. The 820 copies of the first printing were sold out by mid-1928. The book was reprinted many times in more expanded editions; the final edition in 1980 had 510 pages.

In May 1928, Ingalls began a regular column for Scientific American on telescope building called "The Back Yard Astronomer." In about a year the title was changed to "The Amateur Astronomer", about six years later to "The Amateur Telescope Maker", and from 1937 to 1948 it was called "Telescoptics". Eventually Ingalls chose to broaden the column's scope to include "how-to's" from all fields of science, changing the column's name to "The Amateur Scientist" which it retained until 2001.

In the meantime, two additional volumes had appeared: Amateur Telescope Making - Advanced (1st printing, 1937) and Amateur Telescope Making - Book Three (1953). These were based largely on articles that first appeared in Ingalls' column, plus some chapters that were commissioned for the books.

== Philosophy ==
The ATM books promoted a philosophy of telescope making that eschewed standardization and rote rule-following, emphasizing instead the importance of intellectual involvement and creativity in the solution of problems, as well as the highest standards in optical and mechanical performance. In the "Preface" to the 3rd edition (1932) of Volume 1, Ingalls wrote

Telescope making is a scientific hobby and it appeals doubtless because it exacts intelligence; requires patience and sometimes dogged persistence in order to whip the knotty but fascinating problems which arise; demands hard work -- is not dead easy; and compels the exercise of a fair amount of handiness -- enough to exclude the born bungler but no more than is possessed by the average man who can "tinker" his car or the household plumbing...The hobby also appeals because the worker derives something of a thrill while shaping the refined curve of the glass as he realizes that, with scarecly any special tools...he is able to work to within almost a millionth of an inch of absolute perfection.

He continued

Some of the workers -- a very few -- have strongly urged that the amateur's telescopes be standardized on a few definite type specifications, arguing that this would save labor. Others believe that standardized hobbies connote standardized people with standardized ideas, and that the introduction of mass production and labor-saving ideas of efficiency in connection with a hobby is comparable to hiring a workman to play one's games for him. A hobby should be a way to waste time, not to count it.

== Publication history ==
=== Volume 1 ===
Volume 1 underwent substantial changes in content in its 2nd and 3rd editions. Most of the changes consisted of new material, but there were also deletions, e.g. the extract from Ellison's book.

- 1926, Amateur Telescope Making, 1st ed., 1st printing. Scientific American Publishing Co. 102 pp.
- 1928, ATM, 2nd ed., 1st printing. 285pp. Some later printings included an errata sheet.
- 1933, ATM, 3rd ed., 1st printing. " Completely revised and enlarged." 500pp.
- 1935, ATM, 4th ed., 1st printing. "4th ed., completely revised and enlarged." Munn & Co. (although cover still shows Scientific American Publishing Co.).

...

- 1980, ATM, 4th ed., 24th printing. 510p.

=== Volume 2 ===
- 1937, Amateur Telescope Making Advanced, a sequel to Amateur telescope making. Book Two, 1st ed., 1st printing. Munn & Co. 650 pp.
- 1944, ATM Advanced, 1st ed., 4th printing. 650pp.
- 1946, ATM Advanced, 1st ed., 6th printing. 650 pp.

...

- 1978, ATM Advanced, 1st ed., 17th printing. 650pp.

=== Volume 3 ===
- 1953, Amateur Telescope Making, Book Three: contributions to amateur precision optics by advanced amateurs and professionals. 1st ed., 1st printing. Scientific American Publishing Company. 644p.
- 1953, ATM, Book Three. 1st ed., 3rd printing. 646pp.
- 1956, ATM, Book Three, 1st ed., 2nd printing. 646pp.
- 1961, ATM, Book Three, 1st ed., 3rd printing. 646pp.

...

- 1979, ATM, Book Three, 1st.ed., 10th printing. 646pp.

=== Re-publication by Willmann-Bell ===
The ATM books were republished, in a "re-organized" form, by Willmann-Bell in 1996. The chapters were rearranged into ostensibly more logical groupings. While still in three volumes, there is not a one-to-one correspondence between the material in the original and new versions of each volume. The tables of contents and indices were expanded. Articles on pendulum clocks and photoelectric photometry were deleted.

- ISBN for Willmann-Bell editions: 0-943396-48-4 (V1), 0-943396-49-2 (V2), 0-943396-50-6 (V3)
