= Shawn Carlson =

American physicist (born 1960)

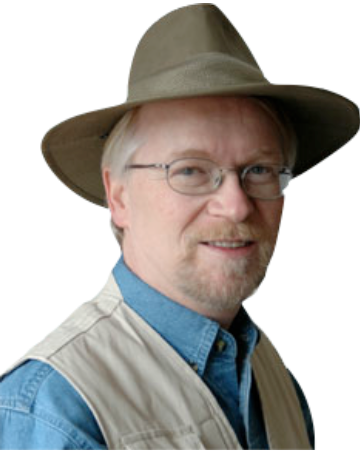
- Dr. Shawn in his LabRats Uniform
- Education: University of California, Berkeley; University of California, Los Angeles
- Occupations: Physicist, science writer, and STEM educator
- Years active: 1985–present
- Known for: Society for Amateur Scientists, LabRats
- Works: "The Amateur Scientist"
- Awards: MacArthur Fellowship

Shawn Carlson (born 1960) is an American physicist, science writer, and a STEM educator.

== Education ==
Carlson graduated from U.C. Berkeley with Bachelor of Science degrees in both Applied Mathematics and Physics in 1981. He graduated from UCLA with a master's degree in physics in 1983, and with a Ph.D. in Nuclear Physics in 1989. As a post doc, Carlson ran the Leuschner Observatory for the Center for Particle Astrophysics at the Lawrence Berkeley National Laboratory and was chief observer for the Berkeley Automated Supernovae Search.

== Career ==
=== Astrology test ===
While an undergraduate, Carlson carried out a double-blind test of astrologers' abilities to extract information about their clients from the apparent positions of celestial objects as seen from the places and times of their clients' births.

Carlson's experiment involved twenty-eight astrologers who were held in high esteem by their peers. They agreed to match over 100 natal charts to psychological profiles that were generated by the California Psychological Inventory (CPI), a standard and well accepted personality test, which the astrologers themselves identified as the scientific instrument that was best aligned with type of information they believed they could divine from their art. The astrologers agreed that the experimental protocol provided a "fair test" of astrology prior to taking part in it.

The participating astrologers were nominated by the National Council for Geocosmic Research (NCGR), which acted as the astrological advisors to ensure that the test was fair. The astrologers came from Europe and the United States. The astrologers also identified the central proposition of natal astrology to be tested.

The results were published in Nature on December 5, 1985. The study found that astrologers were unable to match natal charts to their corresponding personality tests better than chance. Moreover, astrologers were no more likely to be correct even when they had high confidence that they had made a match correctly. Carlson concluded that the result "clearly refutes the astrological hypothesis".

=== Other activities ===
Carlson left academia in 1994 and founded the Society for Amateur Scientists. He contributed to the columns "Science on Society" on The Humanist from 1990-1992, "The Amateur Scientist" in Scientific American from 1995 to 2001, and "The Citizen Scientist" for Make magazine from 2005 to 2007. In 2010, he launched LabRats Science Education Program, an organization that organizes activities for and encourages amateur scientists. He currently serves as Executive Director for the organization.

== Awards ==
- 1999 MacArthur Fellows Program

== Selected works ==
- Satanism in America: How the Devil Got Much More than His Due. El Cerrito, California: Gaia Press. 1989. OCLC 23006862.
- Core Concepts in Physics. New York: Saunders College Publishing. 1998. ISBN 978-0-03-023507-8.
- The Amateur Astronomer. New York: John Wiley & Sons. 2001. ISBN 978-0-471-43699-7.
- The Amateur Biologist. New York: John Wiley & Sons. 2002. ISBN 978-0-471-38281-2.
- The Amateur Scientist: The Complete Collection on CD-ROM. Coventry: Tinker's Guild. 2002. ISBN 978-0-9703476-2-6.
