= C. L. Stong =

Amateur scientist

Clair Leroy "Red" Stong (1902–1975) was an electrical engineer who became the editor of "The Amateur Scientist" column of Scientific American from 1955 until his death.
