= Ingalls (crater) =

Crater on the Moon

- Coordinates: 26.4°N 153.1°W
- Diameter: 37 km
- Depth: Unknown
- Colongitude: 154° at sunrise
- Eponym: Albert G. Ingalls

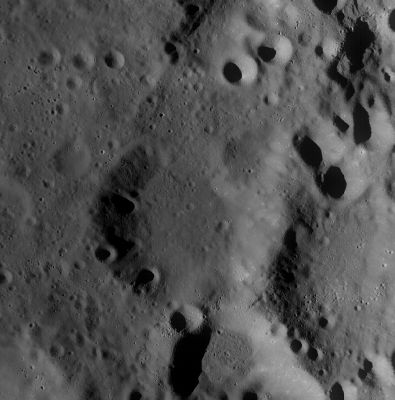

Ingalls is an old lunar impact crater that lies on the far side of the Moon. It is located to the north-northwest of a walled plain called Mach. About the same distance to the west is the crater Joule.

This crater has been heavily damaged by subsequent impacts, leaving little more than an irregular depression in the surface. The outer rim is rounded and pock-marked by small impacts. The interior floor is a nearly featureless surface with a few tiny craterlets. Faint traces of ray material from the crater Jackson, some distance to the west-southwest, lie across the northern rim of Ingalls.

== Satellite craters ==
By convention these features are identified on lunar maps by placing the letter on the side of the crater midpoint that is closest to Ingalls.

Ingalls	Latitude	Longitude	Diameter
G	25.8° N	150.4° W	55 km
M	24.0° N	153.0° W	27 km
U	27.3° N	156.2° W	28 km
V	27.4° N	155.3° W	27 km
Y	29.7° N	154.1° W	23 km
Z	30.3° N	153.3° W	25 km
