= William Frederick Archdall Ellison =

Irish clergyman, scholar,, astronomer (1864–1936)

Reverend William Frederick Archdall Ellison
- Born: 28 April 1864
- Died: 31 December 1936 (aged 72)
- Known for: The Amateur's Telescope (1920)
- Scientific career
- Fields: Astronomy
- Workplaces: Armagh Observatory

Reverend William Frederick Archdall Ellison FRAS(28 April 1864 – 31 December 1936) was an Irish clergyman, Hebrew scholar, organist, avid amateur telescope maker, and, from 1918 to 1936, director of Armagh Observatory in Armagh, Northern Ireland. He was the father of Mervyn A. Ellison, the senior professor of the School of Cosmic Physics at Dunsink Observatory from 1958 to 1963.

== Biography ==
Ellison came from a clerical family, his father Humphrey Eakins Ellison having been Dean of Ferns, County Wexford. He gained a sizarship of classics at Trinity College, Dublin in 1883, became a Scholar of the House in classics in 1886 and graduated in 1887 with junior moderatorships in classics and experimental science. In 1890 he took Holy Orders and moved to England, where he became the Curate of Tudhoe and Monkwearmouth. In 1894 he took his MA and BD degrees and in the following year won the Elrington Theological Prize for work on A study of the First Epistle of St. Peter.

In 1899 he returned to Ireland to become secretary of the Sunday School Society, a post which he held for three years before accepting the incumbency of Monart, Enniscorthy, moving in 1908 to become Rector of Fethard-on-Sea with Tintern in Wexford. Ellison had developed an interest in astronomy, having been introduced to practical optics by Dr N. Alcock of Dublin and set up his first observatory at Wexford. On the 31 December 1913 he joined the British Astronomical Association. He became highly adept at making lenses and mirrors and wrote several books and articles on the subject, including major contributions to the Amateur Telescope Making series, the Journal of the British Astronomical Association, and the weekly newspaper The English Mechanic. On 8 February 1918 he was elected to the fellowship of the Royal Astronomical Society. His book The Amateur's Telescope (1920) is still considered a standard for telescope-makers and a forerunner of the more extensive series on the same topic by Albert Graham Ingalls.

On 2 September 1918 Ellison was appointed Director of the Armagh Observatory. He found the Observatory in a state of disrepair and set about repairing the instruments and the observatory dome. On 3 January 1919 he deeded a telescope of his own to the observatory, an 18-inch reflecting telescope, which is still there.

Ellison was a highly regarded planetary and binary star observer. Working with his son Mervyn, he made many measurements of binary stars using the observatory's 10-inch Grubb refractor telescope and even discovered a new one close to Beta Lyrae, and according to Patrick Moore, was one of the few people to have observed an eclipse of Saturn's moon Iapetus by Saturn's outermost (A) ring on 28 February 1919.

In 1934 Ellison became Canon and Prebendary of Ballymore, Armagh Cathedral. He died on 31 December 1936, having held the office of Director of the observatory for nearly twenty years.

== Bibliography ==
- The Amateur's Telescope (R. Carswell & Son, Ltd., 1920)
