= Amateur telescope making =

Activity of building telescopes as a hobby

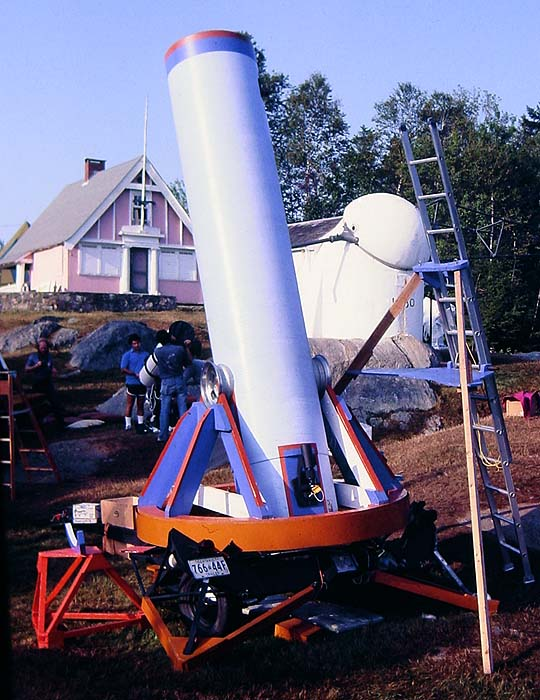
A 22-inch Newtonian reflector sits in front of the clubhouse at Stellafane, home of the Springfield Telescope Makers

Amateur telescope making is the activity of building telescopes as a hobby, as opposed to being a paid professional. Amateur telescope makers (sometimes called ATMs) build their instruments for personal enjoyment of a technical challenge, as a way to obtain an inexpensive or personally customized telescope, or as a research tool in the field of astronomy. Amateur telescope makers are usually a sub-group in the field of amateur astronomy.

== Beginnings ==
Ever since Galileo Galilei adapted a Dutch invention for astronomical use, astronomical telescope making has been an evolving discipline. Many astronomers after the time of Galileo built their own telescopes out of necessity, but the advent of amateurs in the field building telescopes for their own enjoyment and education seems to have come into prominence in the 20th century.

Before the advent of modern mass-produced telescopes, the price of even a modest instrument was often beyond the means of an aspiring amateur astronomer. Building your own was the only economical method to obtain a suitable telescope for observing. Many published works piqued interest in building telescopes, such as the 1920 book The Amateur's Telescope by Irish telescope maker Rev. W. F. A. Ellison.

In the United States in the early 1920s, articles in Popular Astronomy by Russell W. Porter and in Scientific American by Albert G. Ingalls featuring Porter and the Springfield Telescope Makers helped expand interest in the hobby. There was so much public interest, Ingalls began a regular column for Scientific American on the subject (spawning that publications "The Amateur Scientist" column) and later compiled into three books titled Amateur Telescope Making Vol. 1–3. These had a large readership of enthusiast (sometimes called "telescope nuts") constructing their own instruments. Between 1933 and 1990, Sky & Telescope magazine ran a regular column called "Gleanings for ATMs" edited by Earle Brown, Robert E. Cox, and Roger Sinnott. The ready supply of surplus optical components after World War II and later Sputnik and the Space Race also greatly expanded the hobby.

== Common amateur designs ==
A 6-inch (15 cm) Newtonian reflector built by a school student on display at Stellafane

Although the types of telescopes that amateurs build vary widely, including Refractors, Schmidt–Cassegrains and Maksutovs, the most popular telescope design is the Newtonian reflector, described by Russell W. Porter as "The Poor Man's Telescope". The Newtonian has the advantage of being a simple design that allows for maximum size for the minimum expense. And since the design employs a single front surface mirror as its objective it only has one surface that has to be ground and polished, as opposed to three for the Maksutov and four for the refractor and the Schmidt–Cassegrain. Typically a Newtonian telescope of 6 or 8 inches (15 or 20 cm) aperture is a standard starter project, constructed as a club project or by individuals working from books or from plans found on the Internet.

=== Mirror making ===
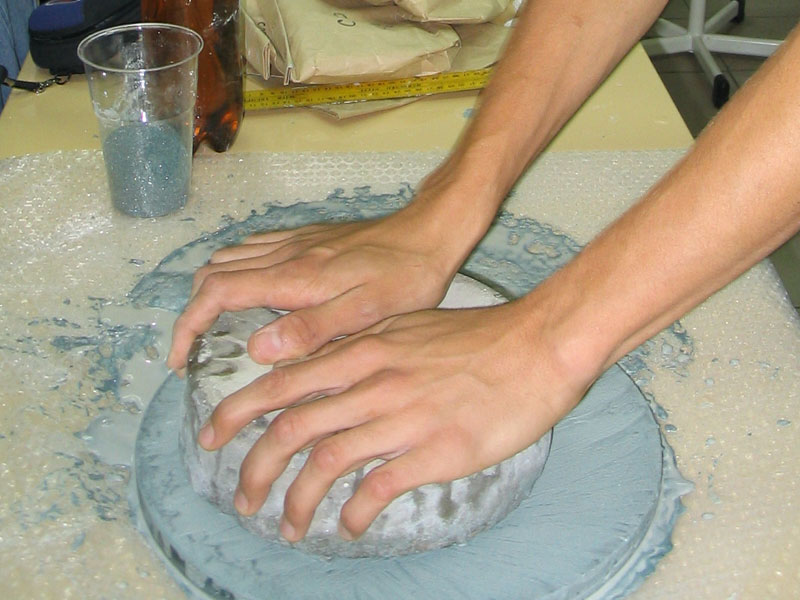
Grinding a mirror using an abrasive and a smaller tool over 300 mm mirror ("ATM Korenica 2006", in Korenica, Croatia)

Since the Newtonian reflector is the most common telescope built by amateur telescope makers, large sections of the literature on the subject are devoted to fabrication of the primary mirror. The mirrors start as a flat disk of glass, typically plate glass or borosilicate glass (Pyrex). The disk is carefully ground, polished and figured to an extremely accurate shape, usually a paraboloid. Telescopes with high focal ratios may use spherical mirrors since the difference in the two shapes is insignificant at those ratios. The tools used to achieve this shape can be simple, consisting of a similarly sized glass tool, a series of finer abrasives, and a polishing pitch lap made from a type of tree sap. Through a whole series of random strokes the mirror naturally tends to become spherical in shape. At that point, a variation in polishing strokes is typically used to create and perfect the desired paraboloidal shape.

==== Foucault test ====
The equipment most amateurs use to test the shape of the mirrors, a Foucault knife-edge test, is, like the tools used to create the surface, simple to fabricate. At its most basic it consists of a light bulb, a piece of tinfoil with a pinhole in it, and a razorblade.

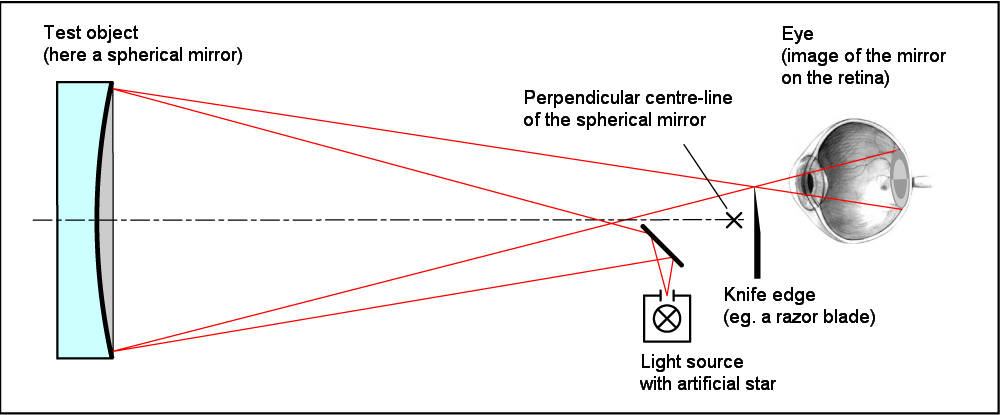
Foucault test setup to measure a mirror

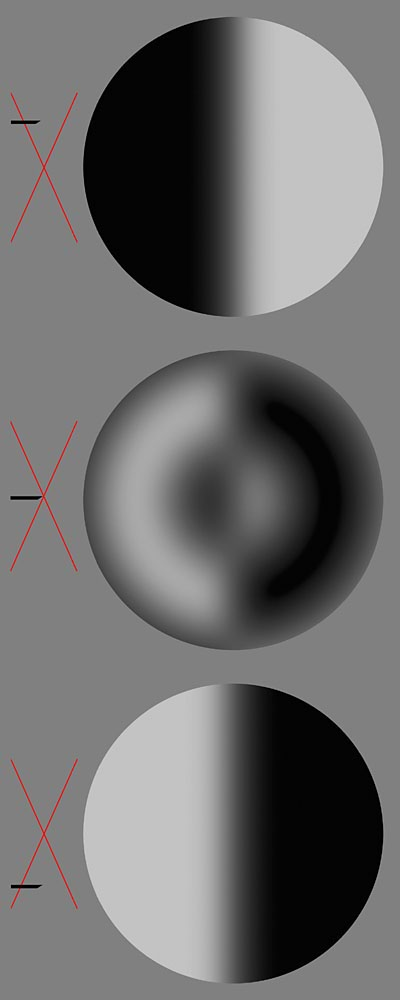
Parabolic mirror showing Foucault shadow patterns made by knife edge inside radius of curvature R (red X), at R and outside R.

After the mirror is polished out it is placed vertically in a stand. The Foucault tester is set up at a distance close to the mirror's radius of curvature. The tester is adjusted so that the returning beam from the pinhole light source is interrupted by the knife edge. Viewing the mirror from behind the knife edge shows a pattern on the mirror surface. If the mirror surface is part of a perfect sphere, the mirror appears evenly lighted across the entire surface. If the mirror is spherical but with defects such as bumps or depressions, the defects appear greatly magnified in height. If the surface is paraboloidal, the mirror looks like a doughnut or lozenge. It is possible to calculate how closely the mirror surface resembles a perfect paraboloid by placing a special mask over the mirror and taking a series of measurements with the tester. This data is then reduced and graphed against an ideal parabolic curve.

Some amateur telescope makers use a similar test called a Ronchi test that replaces the knife edge with a grating comprising several fine parallel wires or an etching on a glass plate. Other tests used include the Gaviola or Caustic test which can measure mirrors of fast f/ratio more accurately, and home-brew interferometric testing made possible in recent years by affordable lasers, digital cameras (such as webcams), and computers.

==== Aluminizing or "silvering" the mirror ====
Once the mirror surface has the correct shape a very thin coating of a highly reflective material is added to the front surface.

Historically this coating was silver. Silvering was put on the mirror chemically, typically by the mirror maker or user. Silver coatings have higher reflectivity than aluminum but corrode quickly and need replacing after a few months.

Since the 1950s most mirror makers have an aluminum coating applied by a thin-film deposition process (work is done by a firm specializing in the process). Modern coatings usually consist of an aluminum layer overcoated with protective transparent compounds.

The mirror is aluminized by placing it in a vacuum chamber with electrically heated tungsten or nichrome coils that can evaporate aluminum. In a vacuum, the hot aluminum atoms travel in straight lines. When they hit the surface of the mirror, they cool and stick. Some mirror coating shops then evaporate a layer of quartz onto the mirror, whereas others expose it to pure oxygen or air in an oven so that the mirror will form a tough, clear layer of aluminum oxide.

== Telescope design ==
A large fork mounted telescope and several other amateur built telescopes on display at Stellafane

The telescopes amateur telescope makers build range from backyard variety to sophisticated instruments that make meaningful contributions to the field of astronomy. Instruments built by amateurs have been employed in planetary study, astrometry, photometry, comet and asteroid discovery to name just a few. Even the “hobbyist” end of the field can break down into several distinct categories such as: observing deep sky objects, observing the planets, solar observing, lunar observation, and astrophotography of all those classes of objects. Therefore, the design, size, and construction of the telescopes vary as well. Some amateur telescope makers build instruments that, while looking crude, are wholly suited to the purpose they are designed for. Others may strive for a more aesthetic look with high levels of mechanical “finish”. Since some amateur telescope makers do not have access to high-precision machining equipment, many elegant designs such as the Poncet Platform, Crayford focuser, and the Dobsonian telescope have evolved, which achieve functionality and stability without requiring precision machining.

The difficulty of construction is another factor in an amateur's choice of project. For a given design the difficulty of construction grows roughly as the square of the diameter of the objective. For example, a Newtonian telescope of 4 inches (100 mm) aperture is a moderately easy science fair project. A 6-to-8-inch (150 to 200 mm) Newtonian is considered a good compromise size since construction is not difficult and results in an instrument that would be expensive to purchase commercially. A 12-to-16-inch (300 to 410 mm) reflecting telescope is difficult, but still within the ability of the average amateur who has had experience building smaller instruments. Amateurs have constructed telescopes as large as 1 metre (39 in) across, but usually small groups or astronomy clubs take on such projects.

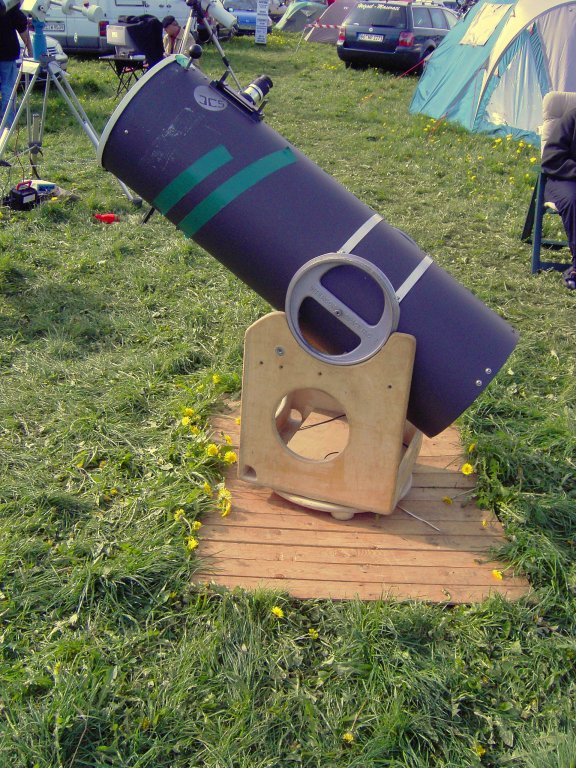
An amateur built Dobsonian telescope of moderate size.

== See also ==
- A List of telescope parts and construction types
- Amateur Telescope Makers of London
- Mirror support cell
- Optical telescope
- PLate OPtimizer
- Stellafane

Types of amateur built telescopes

- Copyscope
- Sun Gun Telescope

== Telescope making books and other published information ==
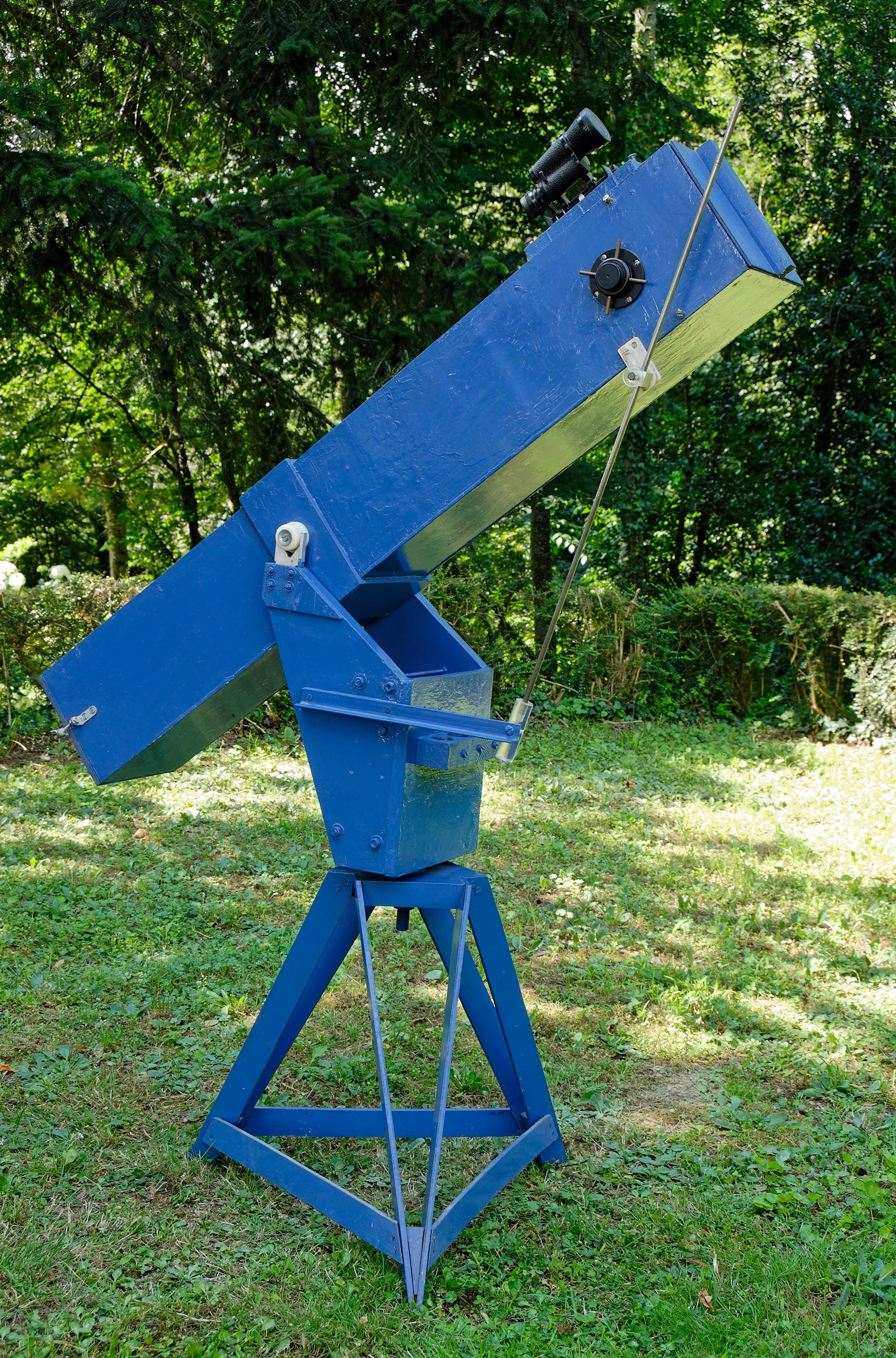
A 180 mm Texereau standard telescope

- Albert G. Ingalls (ed.), Amateur Telescope Making (Vols. 1–3). Orig. edition: Scientific American; new rearranged edition: Willmann-Bell Inc.
- Allyn J. Thompson, Making Your Own Telescope, 1947, Sky Publishing, ISBN 0-933346-12-3. (An online version)
- Jean Texereau, How to Make a Telescope, Willmann-Bell, ISBN 0-943396-04-2
- David Harbour, Understanding Foucault, Netzari Press, ISBN 978-1-934916-01-8, (Amazon.com)
- David Kriege, Richard Berry, The Dobsonian Telescope: A Practical Manual for Building Large Aperture Telescopes, 1997, Willmann-Bell, ISBN 0-943396-55-7
- Richard Berry, Build Your Own Telescope, Willmann-Bell, ISBN 0-943396-69-7
- Harrie Rutten, Martin van Venrooij, Telescope Optics, Evaluation and Design, Willmann-Bell, ISBN 0-943396-18-2
- Neal Eltinge Howard, Standard Handbook for Telescope Making (Hardcover), Harper & Row, ISBN 978-0-06-181394-8
- Albert Highe, Engineering, Design and Construction of Portable Newtonian Telescopes (Hardcover), Willmann-Bell, ISBN 978-0943396958
