= James Gilbert Baker =

American astronomer

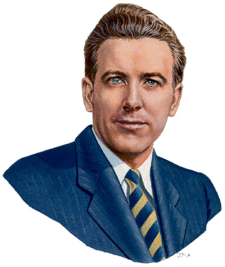
- Born: December 11, 1914; Louisville, Kentucky, U.S.
- Died: June 29, 2005 (aged 90); Bedford, New Hampshire, U.S.
- Education: University of Louisville (B.A.); Harvard University (M.S.); Harvard University (Ph.D.)
- Occupations: Astronomer; lens designer; professor
- Known for: optical systems
- Awards: Magellanic Premium (1952); Elliott Cresson Medal (1962); SPIE Gold Medal (1978)

James Gilbert Baker (November 11, 1914 – June 29, 2005) was an American astronomer and designer of optics systems.

== Biography ==
He was born in Louisville, Kentucky to Jesse B. Baker and Hattie M. Stallard, the fourth child of that couple. He attended Louisville duPont Manual High School then majored in mathematics at the University of Louisville. During his time at the university, he became interested in astronomy and grinding his own mirrors. In 1931 he helped to form the Louisville Astronomical Society. He graduated with a B.A. in 1935.

He met his future wife, Elizabeth Katherine Breitenstein, while at the university.

Pursuing his interest in astronomy, he studied at the Harvard College Observatory. He earned his M.A. in 1936, gained an appointment as a Junior Fellow of the Harvard Society from 1937 until 1943. It was in 1940 that he developed the Baker-Schmidt telescope, a modification of the schmidt camera. In 1942 he was awarded his PhD in astronomy and astrophysics from Harvard University.

After the start of World War II, he was recruited to be a civilian optical designer for the Army's newly formed aerial reconnaissance branch under Colonel George William Goddard. He would design wide-angle camera systems and test them in unpressurized compartments during test flights. He also became a consultant for the Perkin Elmer Corporation. Following the war he then became an advisor for the Air Force Photographic Laboratory.

Living in Cambridge, Massachusetts, from 1946 until 1949 he was an associate professor at Harvard University, as well as continuing his research into optics he had pursued during the war. In 1948 he moved to Orinda, California to join the Lick Observatory as a research associate. He returned to Harvard in 1950.

Prior to the launch of the Sputnik I spacecraft, Baker collaborated with Joseph Nunn to build a series of 12 satellite tracking cameras that would be called the Baker-Nunn camera. Baker designed the optical system for the cameras, which were fabricated by Perkin-Elmer Corporation.

He and Edwin Land were instrumental in persuading President Dwight Eisenhower to have the U-2 spy plane built. Baker also designed the lenses and most of the cameras used on the U-2 spy plane and later the SR-71 Blackbird. In addition, he designed the lenses and cameras used in the Samos satellite program, and a modified version of these optics were later used in the lunar mapping programs.

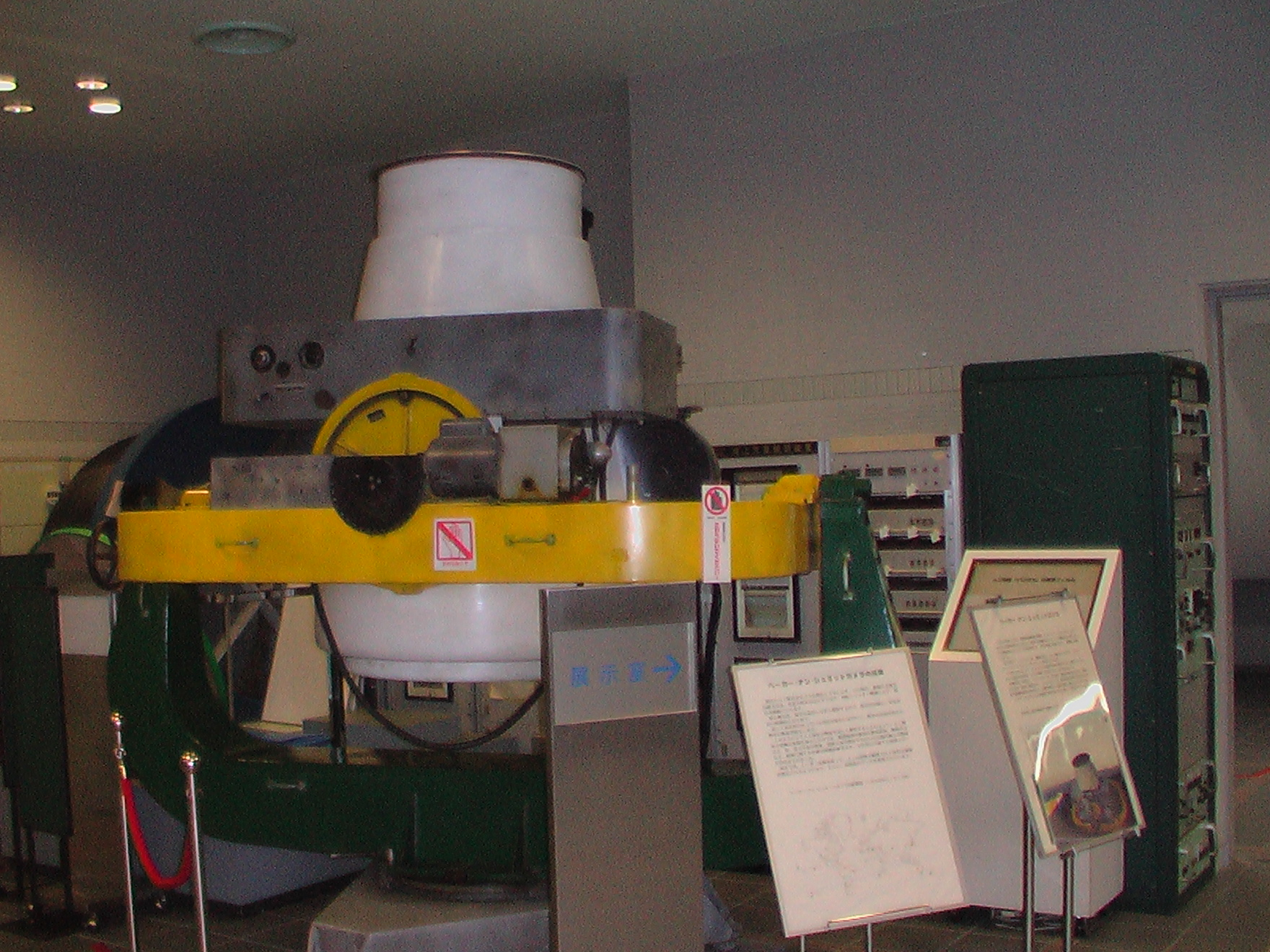
Baker-Nunn camera at the Himeji Science Museum, Japan

During the 1960s he designed the folding optics for the Polaroid SX-70 Land Camera. He also designed the Baker Super-Schmidt camera, which was used to track meteors, and the Paul-Baker telescope. In 1960 he became president of the Optical Society of America.

Baker was the author of many technical papers and he held more than 50 U.S. patents. He was the first person to use a computer for the design of optics.

He died in Bedford, New Hampshire at the age of 90, and was survived by his wife Elizabeth, and his four children.

== Bibliography ==
- J.G. Baker and George Z. Dimitroff, "Telescopes and Accessories", 1945, Blakiston.
- James G. Baker, "Optical Systems for Astronomical Photography", in Amateur Telescope Making, Book Three. A. G. Ingalls, Editor, Scientific American Press, 1953.
- J.G. Baker, "The Catadioptric Refractor," Astronomical Journal 59, 1954.
- J. G. Baker, "Planetary Telescopes", Applied Optics 2.2, 1963.
- J. G. Baker, "On Improving the Effectiveness of Large Telescopes", IEEE Transactions, vol. AES-5, no. 2, March 1969.

== Awards and honors ==
- Medal for Merit from the US president.
- Adolph Lomb Medal, 1942
- Fellow of the National Academy of Sciences, 1946.
- Elliott Cresson Medal, 1962
- Frederic Ives Medal, 1965.
- Member of the American Philosophical Society, 1970
- Joseph Fraunhofer Award, 1991.
- Recognition as a Fellow and Honorary Member of The Optical Society
- Recognition as a Pioneer of National Reconnaissance
- Fellow of the American Academy of Arts and Sciences.
- Air Force Space and Missile Pioneers Award; inducted into Air Force Space and Missile Pioneers Hall of Fame.
