= List of original copies of the Porter Garden Telescope =

Ornamental garden telescope from the 1920s

This is a list of the known original copies of The Porter Garden Telescope. For information purposes, are also included those copies that their location are currently unknown, but there are records with some of their data.

Serial Number	Last Known Owner	Location	Features / Accessories	Status / Functionality	Information	Last information
2	Private collector				Conference with exhibition of the copy.	24 October 2018
3	Private collector				List of copies.	Autumn, 2007
10	Calusa Nature Center & Planetarium	Fort Myers, Florida	Non-original optics.	Defects.	Offered for sale.	March, 2008
13	Observatorio de Cincinnati	Cincinnati, Ohio	Helical focuser.	Complete.	Photo.	September, 2016
17	Private collector		No patina. Double ocular for two simultaneous users.	Complete in the absence of some eyepieces.	Conference with exhibition of the copy.	30 October 2010
21	Private collector		Original concrete pedestal.	Missed optics.	Winning bid of $9,500.	17 June 2012
28	Private collector				List of copies.	Autumn, 2007
31	The Springfield Telescope Makers, Inc.	Springfield, Vermont	Original wooden case.	Damaged primary mirror. Prism absent on exhibition.	List of copies.	Autumn, 2007
36	Private collector				List of copies.	Autumn, 2007
42	Santa Barbara Museum of Natural History	Santa Barbara, California	Only survive the original pieces called bell and blade-bowl set.	Missing elements Functional restoration.	Photo.	March, 2014
43	Private collector		Rack and pinion focuser.	Missing elements. Lack of mirror, eyepieces, prism and base.	Sold at auction for $1,845. Photos.	November, 2014
44	Private collector				List of copies.	Autumn, 2007
46	Private collector				List of copies.	Autumn, 2007
47	Mount Cuba Astronomical Observatory	Greenville, Delaware	Original wooden case.	Complete.		July, 2007
49	National Museum of American History, Smithsonian Institution	Washington DC	Rack and pinion focuser.	Complete. Mirror requires reconditioning.	Out of exhibition. Stored.	July, 2018
52	Buffalo Museum of Science	Buffalo, New York	Rack and pinion focuser.	Complete. Reconditioned.		July, 2018
53	Private collector				List of copies.	Autumn, 2007
54	Longwood Gardens	Kennett Square, Pennsylvania	Unpolluted, no patina.	Missing original optics.	Photo.	December, 2012
Without Number	Private collector		No numeration assigned by the manufacturer (valued authenticity by manufacturing details).	Incomplete. Missing base and optics.	Photos. Winning bid of $3,000.	August, 2013

== See also ==
- The Porter Garden Telescope
