= The Sky (magazine) =

Magazine for amateur astronomers (1935–1941)

The Sky was a magazine for amateur astronomers published between 1935 and 1941. It was the successor to a monthly bulletin called The Amateur Astronomer, which was published by the Amateur Astronomers Association (AAA) of New York City, and a precursor to Sky & Telescope before merging with The Telescope.

== See also ==
- Amateur astronomy
