= The Amateur Scientist =

Column in the Scientific American

"The Amateur Scientist" was a column in the Scientific American, and was the definitive "how-to" resource for citizen-scientists for over 72 years (1928–2001), making it the longest running column in Scientific American's history. The column was regarded for revealing the brass-tacks secrets of research and showing home-based experimenters how to make original discoveries using only inexpensive materials. Since its début in 1928, "The Amateur Scientist" was a primary resource for science fair projects. It also inspired amateur experimenters, launched careers in science, and enjoyed a place of honor in classrooms and school libraries all over the world.

Although always accessible to an amateur's budget, projects from "The Amateur Scientist" were often elegant and sophisticated. Some designs were so innovative that they set new standards in a field. Indeed, professionals continue to borrow from "The Amateur Scientist" to find low-cost solutions to real-world research problems.

== Albert Ingalls ==
"The Amateur Scientist" traces its pedigree to May 1928, when Albert G. Ingalls began the column as "The Back Yard Astronomer." Ingalls told amateurs how they could get personally involved in astronomy by building professional-quality instruments and carrying out cutting-edge observations. The first sentence in the new column stated: "Here we amateur telescope makers are, more than 3000 of us, gathered together in our own back yard at last." The name of the column changed several times, to "The Amateur Astronomer", "The Amateur Telescope Maker", and "Telescoptics." Much of the information from these articles was eventually published by Ingalls and Scientific American in the books Amateur Telescope Making. The articles and the books are credited with helping to expand the hobby of amateur telescope making. In April 1952, Ingalls chose to broaden the column's scope to include "how-to's" from all fields of science. When he did, he also changed the department's name to "The Amateur Scientist."

== C. L. Stong ==
Ingalls wrote his column for almost 30 years, until his retirement in May 1955. In that year the publisher selected Clair L. Stong to continue the feature. Stong was an electrical engineer from 1926 to 1962 for Westinghouse. He extended the column, frequently peppering it with extremely sophisticated projects including home-built lasers and atom smashers. Many working professional scientists say that they first got hooked on science through Stong's amazing columns. One of the activities Stong promoted during the International Geophysical Year was a program for amateur astronomers called Operation Moonwatch. It involved the tracking of artificial satellites by amateurs.

In 1960 Stong compiled a book titled The Amateur Scientist, (Simon and Schuster) the only collection of articles that has ever been published from this column prior to Carlson and Greaves' complete CD-collection (see below). However, limited to paper and ink, Stong could only fit in 57 projects. Stong's book was reviewed in New Scientist as "most fascinating" and sold well. It went out of print in 1972 and is much sought-after today by amateur scientists and collectors.

== Jearl Walker ==
Stong ran the department for over 20 years until he died in 1977. In 1978, Scientific American hired Jearl Walker, Ph.D. to take over. Walker had caught the publisher's attention thanks to The Flying Circus of Physics, Answers, a book Walker wrote which highlighted the fascinating physics of the everyday world. Under Walker's stewardship "The Amateur Scientist" presented fewer how-to projects, and instead focused on the physics of common phenomena.

Walker resigned from Scientific American in 1990 after 12 years. Collectively, Ingalls, Stong and Walker account for 90 percent of all articles.

== Forrest Mims ==
After Walker left, Scientific American decided to rededicate the column to hands-on projects and so they offered the column to Forrest Mims III, a renowned writer of books for Radio Shack and an amateur scientist. However, during a conversation between Mims and the publisher, it came up that Mims was an evangelical Christian and creationist who rejected the science of evolution. Not wanting to be perceived as supporting Creationism, Scientific American rescinded their offer. Mims charged religious discrimination without success. Ultimately, the magazine published just three of Mims' articles, along with several letters to the editor concerning his firing.

Although the incident did not diminish Scientific American's commitment to the column, it did make the editors reluctant to offer the column to another amateur scientist. The magazine invited a number of potential columnists to submit articles, some of which it published. But Scientific American was unable to find anyone with both professional credentials and the breadth of scientific interests necessary to recapture the popularity the column enjoyed under Stong and Ingalls. Without a regular columnist, the department languished, appearing only sporadically between 1990 and 1995.

== Shawn Carlson ==
In 1995 Scientific American discovered the Society for Amateur Scientists. Its executive director, Shawn Carlson, Ph.D., was a physicist and established science writer who had left academe a year earlier to devote his career to advancing amateur science. Dr. Carlson took over the column in November of that year and immediately returned its focus to cutting-edge science projects that amateurs can do inexpensively at home. Over one million Scientific American readers turned to "The Amateur Scientist" every month. In 1999, Carlson won a MacArthur Fellowship for science education in part for the innovative projects he developed for "The Amateur Scientist".

In 2001, Scientific American came under new management. As part of a redesign of the magazine, all of the long-running columns were retired, including "The Amateur Scientist". March 2001 was the last time the column ran in Scientific American. Archived versions of the column remained available to Scientific American paid subscribers via their website.

Carlson, along with co-editor Sheldon Greaves, Ph.D., created The Amateur Scientist-The Complete Collection, a CD-ROM containing all the articles in a fully text-searchable HTML format.

== Online back-issues and CD-ROM ==
Sometime after 2007 the Scientific American removed the subscriber-only requirement for certain years of the magazine, making "The Amateur Scientist" column for 1999-2001 available online.
