= Copyscope =

Type of refracting telescope

A copyscope is type of refracting telescope that can be made by hand rather than bought in which the objective lens comes from an old photocopy machine, hence the origin of the name. The lenses usually come from defective or old photocopiers, allowing for the objective to be obtained for free or at a low cost. They are usually modest diameter lenses, ranging from 50mm to 60mm, of short focal length, good for use in a portable, wide-field telescope, but unsuitable for higher magnifications. Given the use of good components, however, a copyscope can become a rich-field instrument capable of reaching many extended objects and even star fields.

== History ==
The way in which copyscopes are constructed was first shown and explained in the May 1986 issue of Astronomy Magazine by Ken Bird. Surplus photocopier lenses from 200 to 300 mm focal length along with PVC pipe components for the tube and lens holder were used to build the copyscope described in the magazine.

== Construction ==
Copyscopes usually use an objective lens sourced from a photocopier. Usually 50mm to 60mm in diameter, these lenses operate at low f/numbers (f-ratio of around f4 to f6) but cover a large field of view, and usually used at 1:1 conjugate. Other parts of a copyscope include an eyepiece, typically with a barrel diameter of 1 1/4 inches with a focal length of 17 to 20 mm or longer. The availability of components over the Web allows enthusiasts to build a copyscope that can replace small Newtonian design as their first serious telescope.

== Benefits and Drawbacks ==
Pros

- When compared to the majority of telescopes that are offered in stores, the Copyscope gives a much larger field of view along with increased light gathering.
- If all the equipment necessary is at hand and the scope is built by the individual the result could more than likely be a very economical bottom-of-the-line telescope, as good as or even better than anything offered in the stores for the same value of price, however, in recent years some very good cheap telescopes have become available for little more than the cost of making a Copyscope.

Cons

- The lenses used for the telescope were not manufactured for this purpose, so they're not able to achieve a sharp focus at high magnification across the whole field of view. For wide-field, low power views of the heavens these telescopes work well and low power Copyscopes can make good finder scopes when used on larger telescopes.

== See also ==
- List of telescope types
