= The Telescope (magazine) =

Amateur astronomer magazine (1931–1941)

The Telescope was a magazine for amateur astronomers published between 1931 and 1941. The magazine was first published as a quarterly under the editorship of Harlan Stetson, director of the Perkins Observatory in Ohio. It featured popular articles about contemporary research. In 1934 Stetson moved to Cambridge, Massachusetts and brought the magazine with him. Publishing duties were assumed jointly by the Harvard College Observatory and the Bond Astronomical Club, under the editorship of Donald H. Menzel. The Telescope became a bimonthly publication at this time.

In 1941, The Telescope was merged with The Sky, creating Sky & Telescope magazine, which has remained in publication ever since.

== See also ==
- Amateur astronomy
