= Astronomical League =

Organization of amateur astronomy societies

The Astronomical League is an umbrella organization of amateur astronomy societies. Currently their membership consists of over 330 organizations across the United States, along with a number of Members-at-Large, Patrons, and Supporting members.

The mission of the Astronomical League is to promote the science of astronomy by (1) fostering astronomical education; (2) providing incentives for astronomical observation and research; and (3) assisting communication between amateur astronomical societies.

The Astronomical League provides a number of observing awards to members locating and describing certain specified astronomical objects or events, and produces a periodical publication, The Reflector.

== History ==
The beginning of the Astronomical League dates back to 1939 when members of eleven amateur astronomical societies met at the American Museum of Natural History in New York City. Similar meetings followed in Pittsburgh, 1940, Washington D.C., 1941, and Detroit, 1946. During this process of formation, the naming of the organization evolved from the Amateur Astronomers League of America to the short-lived Amateur Astronomer's League. World War II delayed much of this early progress, but at the 1946 meeting, final plans laid the foundation for a permanent organization constituting a nationwide federation of societies.

The next convention took place in Philadelphia, July 4, 1947, where the federation came into being with the adoption of bylaws was adopted, the election of officers, and the name "Astronomical League" was selected. Shortly thereafter, the organization was incorporated as a non-profit organization.

In 2003, The Astronomical League achieved the long-sought goal of a permanent, National Office. This provided a central location for communications, file storage, and general operations. At the same time, the Astronomical League hired its first employee, an office manager. The National Office is located at 9201 Ward Parkway, Suite 100, Kansas City, MO 64114.

== Awards ==
Awards given by the league include the Leslie C. Peltier Award, the Jack Horkheimer Award, and the National Young Astronomer's Award.

=== Leslie C. Peltier Award ===
The Leslie C. Peltier Award is an annual award given by the Astronomical League to an amateur astronomer who has contributed observations of lasting significance. It was created in 1980 and was first awarded in 1981.

The award is named in honor of Leslie Peltier, an amateur astronomer from Delphos, Ohio, who was described by Harlow Shapley as "the world's greatest nonprofessional astronomer".

=== G.R. Wright Award ===
The G.R. Wright Award is given no more than once each year. This award honors current or past League volunteers for service to the Astronomical League. It was first awarded in 1985.

=== National Young Astronomer's Award ===
The National Young Astronomer Award is an award given by the Astronomical League to students of high-school age who have excelled in astronomical research. It was first awarded in 1993.

== Observing Programs ==
One of the most important programs of the Astronomical League is its Observing Programs, in which an individual follows a prescribed program and upon completion earns a certificate and often a lapel pin. The Astronomical League approved its first observing program called “Messier Club,” in 1966. The program challenged observers to locate and observe the deep sky objects listed in Charles Messier's catalog of objects. Observers of 70 Messier objects receive a certificate, while those observing the complete list of 110 receive a certificate and pin.

Fourteen years later, a second observing program was added for observing 400 of the objects in the Herschel list. By the year 2000, there were 15 observing programs, some of which had more than one level. In 2014, Mike Benson and Aaron Clevenson, were appointed as National Observing Program Directors supervising the work of each observing program's coordinators. In 2015 Cliff Mygatt was appointed as a Director. Mike Benson retired in 2016. By 2018, with 63 observing programs and almost as many program coordinators, others joined the team of National Observing Program Directors: Al Lamperti and Maynard Pittendreigh. Marie Lott joined this team in 2020.

The Master Observer Progression Awards began in 2001, with the creation of the Master Observer Award, requiring the completion of five specific observing programs: Messier Observing Program, Binocular Messier Observing Program, Lunar Observing Program, Double Star Observing Program, and the Herschel 400 Observing Program, plus 5 observer-selected Observing Programs. Additional Master level programs were added in 2016. The Master Progression added an Observer Award, which was simpler than the original Master Observer Award, and added more complex and demanding levels of Advanced Observer, Silver, Gold, and Platinum Master Observer levels.

== Past Presidents ==
1. Harlow Shapley Interim (June–July 1947)
2. Edward Halbach 1947-48
3. Helen Federer 1948-49
4. Charles H. LeRoy 1949-51
5. G. R. "Bob" Wright 1951-52
6. Rolland LaPelle 1952-54
7. James Karle 1954-55
8. Grace Scholz 1955-57
9. Russell C. Maag 1957-58
10. Chandler Holton 1958-60
11. Norm Dalke 1960-62
12. Ralph Dakin 1962-64
13. Arthur P. Smith, Jr. 1964-66
14. Gene Tandy 1966-68
15. William DuVall 1968-70
16. W. C. Shewmon 1970-72
17. G. R. "Bob" Wright 1972-74
18. Robert Fried 1974-75
19. Rollin P. VanZandt 1975-77
20. Robert Fried 1977-78
21. Robert Young 1978-80
22. Orville Brettman 1980-82
23. Jerry Sherlin 1982-84
24. George Ellis 1984-86
25. Jim Brown 1986-88
26. Ken Willcox 1988-90
27. James H. Fox 1990-94
28. Barry B. Beaman 1994-98
29. Charles E. "Chuck" Allen III 1998-02
30. Robert L Gent 2002-06
31. Terry Mann 2006-10
32. Carroll Iorg 2010-14
33. John J. Goss 2014-2018
34. William "Bill" Bogardus 2018 (died in office)
35. Ron Kramer 2018-2020
36. Carroll Iorg 2020-2024
37. Charles E. "Chuck" Allen III 2024-

== See also ==
- List of astronomy awards
- List of astronomical societies
