= Sky & Telescope =

American monthly magazine

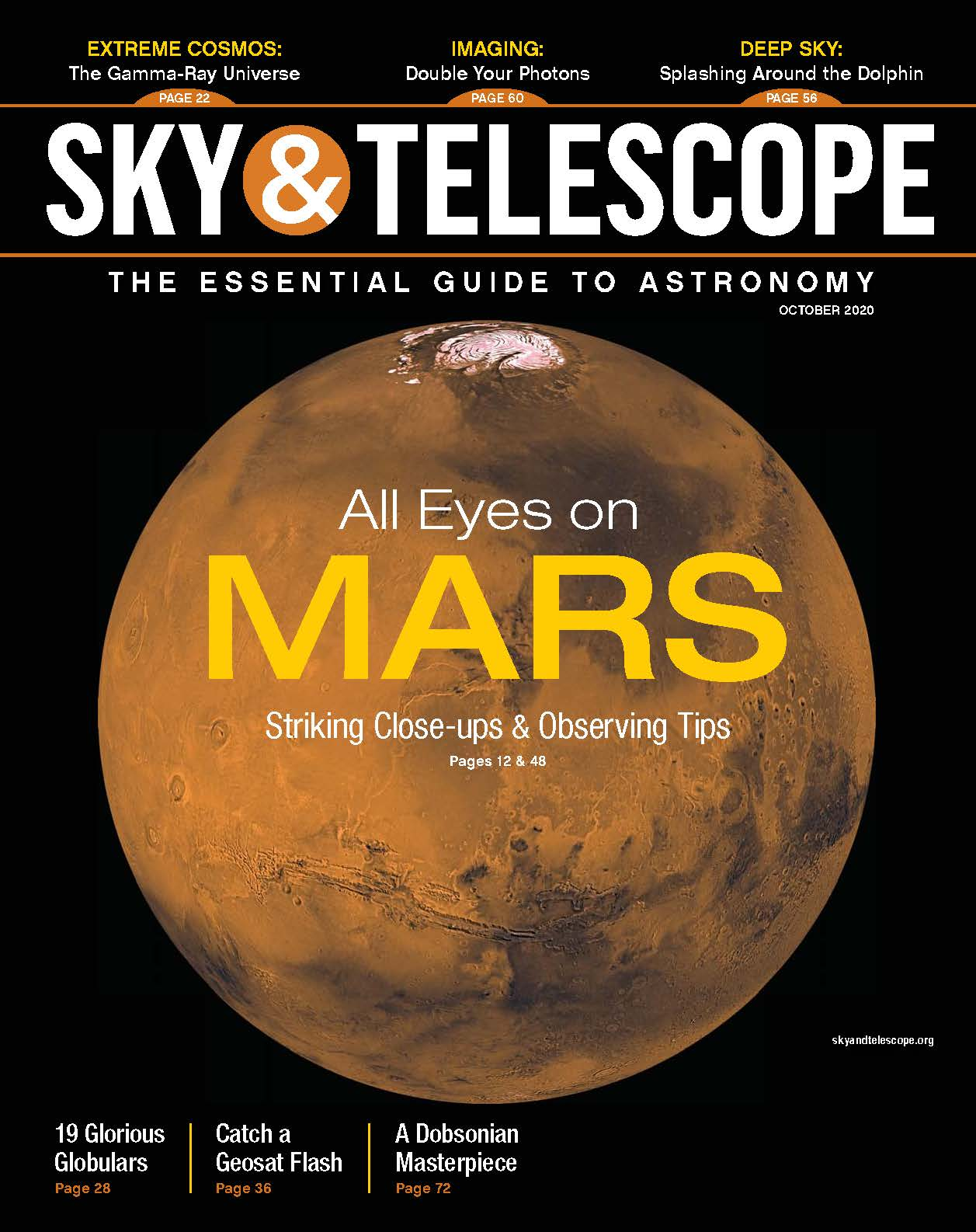
- October 2020 issue
- Editor in Chief: Diana Hannikainen
- Categories: Astronomy
- Frequency: Monthly
- Total circulation: 62,234 (2020)
- Founded: 1941
- First issue: November 1941
- Company: American Astronomical Society
- Country: United States
- Based in: Cambridge, Massachusetts
- Language: English
- Website: skyandtelescope.org
- ISSN: 0037-6604

Sky & Telescope (S&T) is a monthly magazine covering all aspects of amateur and professional astronomy, including what to see in the sky tonight and new findings in astronomy. Other topics covered include:

- observing guides for planets, galaxies, star clusters, and other objects visible in the night sky
- reviews of telescopes and other astronomical equipment, books, and software
- events in the amateur astronomy community
- amateur telescope making
- astrophotography

The articles are intended for the informed lay reader and include detailed discussions of current discoveries, frequently by participating scientists. The magazine is illustrated in full color, with both amateur and professional photography of celestial sights, as well as tables and charts of upcoming celestial events.

== History ==
Sky & Telescope was founded by Charles A. Federer and his wife Helen Spence Federer. The duo had formed the Sky Publishing Corporation in late 1939 to manage a magazine called The Sky, which focused on content for the amateur astronomy community. Then in mid-1941, they took on the editorial management of another magazine,The Telescope, where articles appeared presenting scientific findings for a popular audience. The first issue of Sky & Telescope — November 1941 — was published from a new office at the Harvard College Observatory.

In 2006, Sky Publishing Corporation was sold to New Track Media, a portfolio company of the private equity firm Boston Ventures. In 2014, New Track's portfolio was sold to F+W Media. Following the mid-2019 bankruptcy of F+W media, the American Astronomical Society acquired Sky & Telescope.

For decades before the rise of the internet, Sky & Telescope played a vital role in joining amateur astronomers across the country, and eventually across the globe. The magazine played an important role in the dissemination of knowledge about telescope making, through the column "Gleanings for ATMs" that ran from 1933 to 1990. In December 1995, the magazine published the Caldwell catalogue, which was authored by Patrick Moore.

The magazine's main competitor is Astronomy.

== Editors ==
- Charles A. Federer (1909–1999), first editor (1941–1964); Helen Spence Federer (1911–1983), first managing editor
- Joseph Ashbrook (1918–1980), second editor (1964–1980)
- Leif Robinson (1939–2011), third editor (1980–2000)
- Richard Fienberg (1956–), fourth editor-in-chief (2000–2008)
- Robert Naeye, fifth editor-in-chief (2008–2014)
- Peter Tyson, sixth editor-in-chief (2014–2024)
- Diana Hannikainen, seventh editor-in-chief (2024–)

== Columns ==
Notable magazine columns have included:

- Celestial Calendar (published monthly since 1942)
- Gleanings for ATMs (published between 1933 and 1990)
- Astronomer's Workbench
- Deep-Sky Wonders, written by Walter Scott Houston from 1946 to 1993 and by Sue French from 1993 to 2018
- Binocular Highlights: Originally part of the "Stars & Planets" column, starting in March 1994, it became its own column in 2006 as Northern Binocular Highlights, later simply Binocular Highlights.

Collections of Deep-Sky Wonders and Binocular Highlights columns were subsequently published as books.

== Websites ==
In the late 1990s, Sky & Telescope launched a website featuring night-sky sights and the latest developments in astronomy. With the magazine's change in ownership to the nonprofit American Astronomical Society in 2019, the URL changed to skyandtelescope.org. The website's viewership has since grown to 500,000 visitors per month. An associated website, shopatsky.com, offers globes, atlases, books, and other products.

Sky & Telescope is also accessible to both print and digital subscribers via the Nxtbook platform.
