= Albert Graham Ingalls =

American astronomer (1888–1958)

- Born: January 16, 1888; Elmira, New York
- Died: August 13, 1958 (aged 70); Cranford, New Jersey
- Occupations: Associate editor, Scientific American
- Notable credit(s): Amateur Telescope Making, vols. 1-3

Albert Graham Ingalls (January 16, 1888–August 13, 1958) was an American scientific editor and amateur astronomer. Through his columns in Scientific American, including "The Amateur Scientist", and his three-volume series Amateur Telescope Making, Ingalls exerted a great influence on amateur astronomy and amateur telescope making in the United States.

== Biography ==
Ingalls was born in Elmira, New York, an only child. In 1914 he graduated from Cornell University. He worked odd jobs, including telegraph operator, until enlisting in the New York National Guard and serving in France during World War I.

In 1923 he became an editor at Scientific American, an affiliation he maintained until his retirement in 1955. He later described his editorial duties as "obtaining articles, editing articles, finding the illustrations, writing the captions, reading the proof and, in general, being wet-nurse to six major articles each month." He started a regular column, "The Back Yard Astronomer" in 1928 which he later named "The Amateur Scientist". His final column appeared in April 1955 shortly before his retirement.

Ingalls's primary interests were in the areas of astronomy and telescope construction. After reading an article by Russell W. Porter on telescope making, he arranged a visit by Porter to New York in June 1925, out of which came an article later that year in Scientific American. The article was so well received that Ingalls began a series of columns on amateur telescope making, some written in collaboration with Porter. Ingalls and Porter became close friends and the two men remained at the center of the American amateur telescope making community for the next thirty years. A number of articles from the columns, together with illustrations by Porter, were published in book form as Amateur Telescope Making, the first volume of which appeared in 1926, followed by volumes 2 and 3 in 1937 and 1953. These books helped to create lasting public interest in observational astronomy. The books have come to be called "the bible of telescope making".

During World War II, Ingalls organized the work of amateur telescope makers to help overcome the shortage of roof prisms for military instruments.

After his retirement in 1955, Ingalls travelled about New York state studying genealogy until he was struck by a car. His injuries left him paralyzed, and he died a year later at the age of 70.

== Awards ==
- Astronomical League Award (1951)
- Blair Medal of the Western Amateur Astronomers (1954)

== Named after him ==
- In 1970, lunar crater Ingalls, approximately 37 kilometers in diameter, and located on the far side of the Moon, was named after him.
- On 14 May 2021, asteroid 75971 Unkingalls, discovered by astronomers with the Catalina Sky Survey at Catalina Station in 2000, was named in his memory by the Working Group for Small Bodies Nomenclature.

== Bibliography ==
- Albert G. Ingalls (ed.), Amateur Telescope Making, Volumes 1-3 (Scientific American Press: New York)
