= Astronomy in New York City =

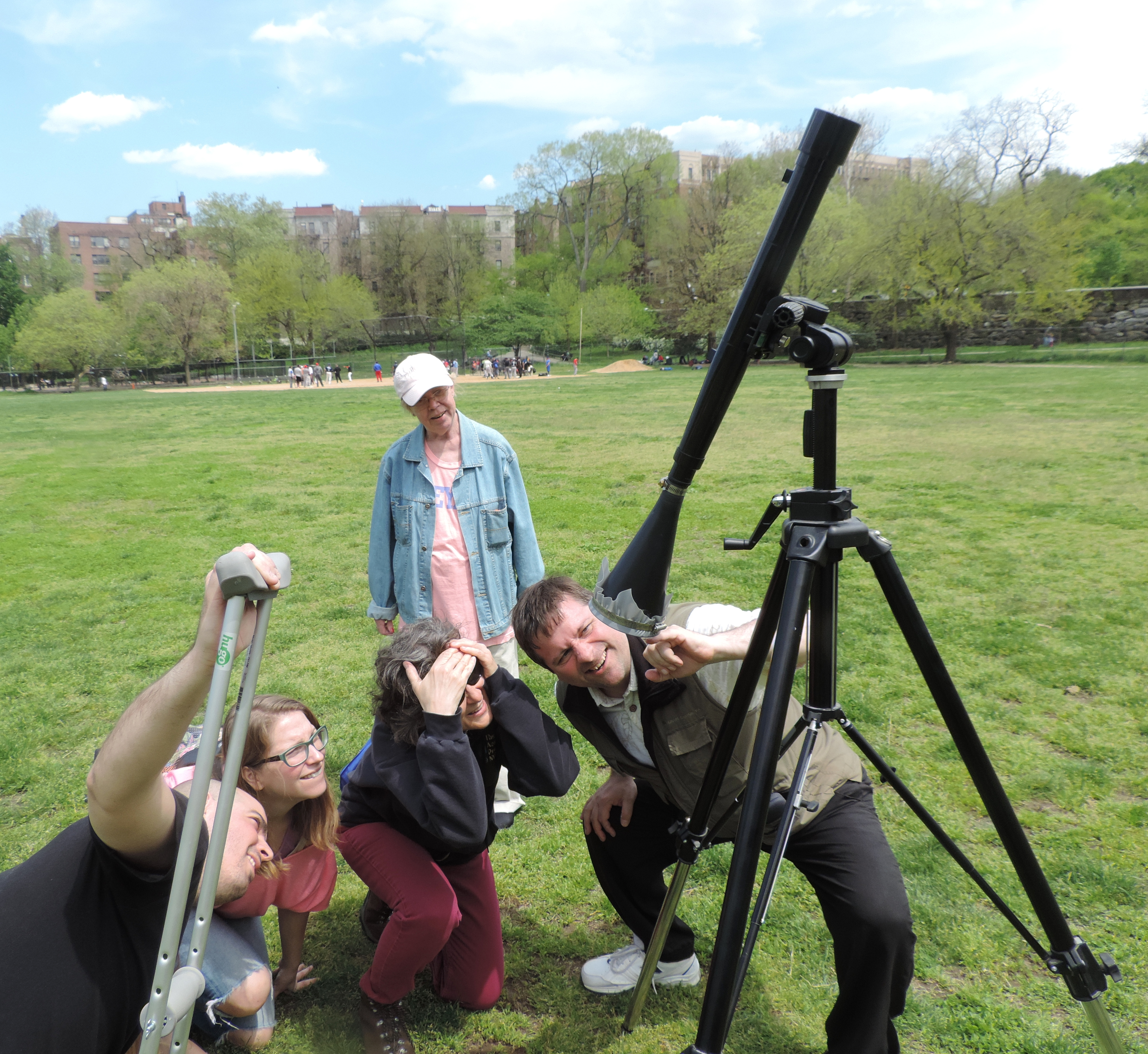
Professor sets up his telescope in a Manhattan park for a Transit of Venus in 2016

Astronomy in New York City has been practiced for at least many centuries. Professional observatories were established in the 19th century, though their use declined as light pollution increased during the 20th century. The city remains a center of education and research in astronomy as in other fields, and has a community of amateur astronomers. Prior to European settlement, the area that became New York City was inhabited by the Lenape, an indigenous group whose cosmology included the known planets and explained the earth's position in the universe. In 1818, Benjamin and Samuel Demilt opened the first observatory on top of a jewelry store. The first determination of New York City's longitude was made from the cupola of Columbia College during the solar eclipse of 1821. In 1856, Lewis Morris Rutherfurd built a private observatory at his Manhattan home and later donated his photographs to Columbia University. Columbia University's Rutherfurd Observatory has since 1927 been located on the roof of Pupin Hall. The College of Staten Island also hosts an Astrophysical Observatory. The Amateur Astronomers Association of New York is supporting a plan to establish the New York Public Observatory.

== Lenape cosmology ==
Adriaen van der Donck's Description of New Netherland of 1655 mentions Lenape reverence for the Sun and the Moon, and that they recognized all of the classical planets. Sun and Moon are addressed in later-recorded tradition as "Elder Brothers", and their duality may find expression in the two fires of the Delaware Big House rite. There is also a Lenape account of the Pleiades.

Turtle Island, the distinctive conception of the Earth and its place in the universe, was first recorded as explained by Lenape elder Tantaqué and published in Jasper Danckaerts' journal of 1679–80. This symbol is reflected in the modern turtle roof of 44 Union Square.

== History of observatories ==
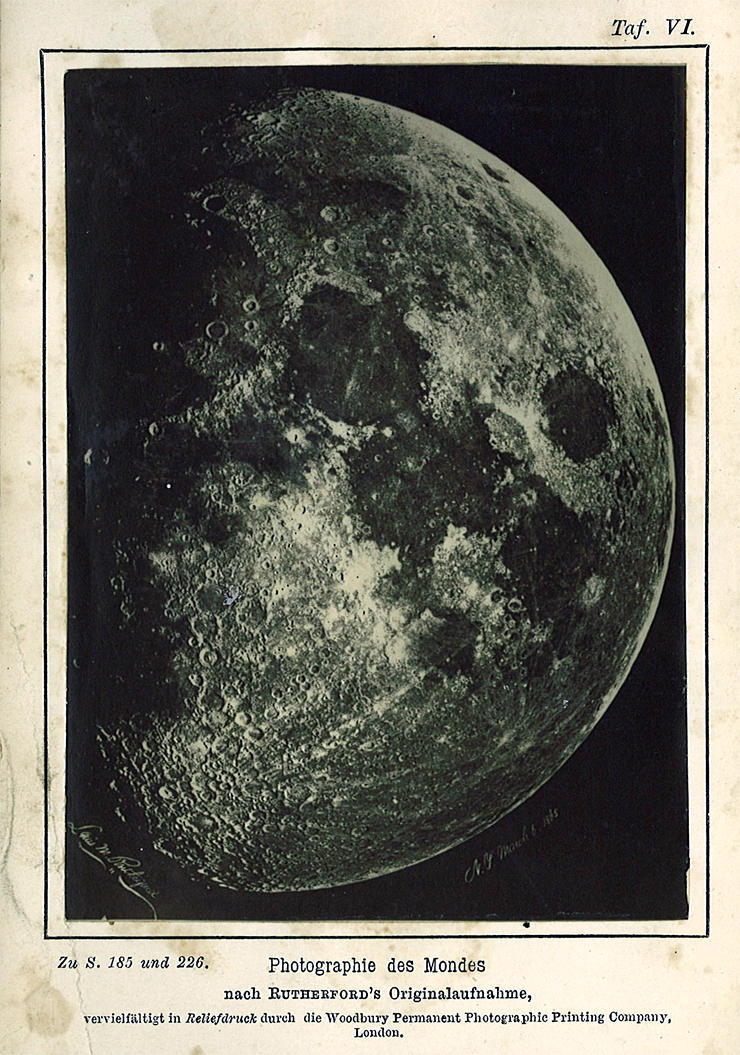
Moon, New York, 6 March 1865 – Lewis M. Rutherfurd

Merchants Benjamin and Samuel Demilt opened their Pearl Street watch and jewelry store topped by Demilt's Longitude Observatory in 1818, and apparently made some observations from there. The family had also since 1811 owned Summit Rock in the vicinity of the future Seneca Village landscape of what became Central Park, and they may have intended it for an observatory. James Renwick made a determination of New York City's longitude from the cupola of Columbia College during the solar eclipse of August 1821, crediting the Demilt brothers with assistance.

John William Draper of New York University took the first detailed astrophotography of the Moon in 1840, his sons Henry Draper and Daniel Draper also later working in this vein. Leading telescope maker Henry Fitz first exhibited his instruments at the 1845 American Institute Fair, and showed fairgoers Comet Donati in 1858. One of Fitz's most important clients was Lewis Morris Rutherfurd, who built a private observatory at his Manhattan home in 1856 and further developed the technique, later donating his photographs to Columbia University. A Meteorological and Astronomical Observatory was formerly part of the Arsenal in Central Park, established with the support of Andrew Haswell Green, and with Daniel Draper as its founding director from 1868. The astronomical function never actualized, the New York Meteorological Observatory is still in operation at the park's Belvedere Castle.

Columbia University's Rutherfurd Observatory has since 1927 been located on the roof of Pupin Hall. The College of Staten Island also hosts an Astrophysical Observatory. The Amateur Astronomers Association of New York is supporting a plan to relocate a facility from Nassau Community College on Long Island to Jerome Park Reservoir in the Bronx, to establish the New York Public Observatory.

== Planetarium and museum exhibits ==
The Rose Center for Earth and Space, founded in 1933 as the Hayden Planetarium, is a center of astronomical activities in New York City, and presents daily shows. Other planetariums are located in Brooklyn, Staten Island, and Upper Manhattan,

== "Telescope men" ==
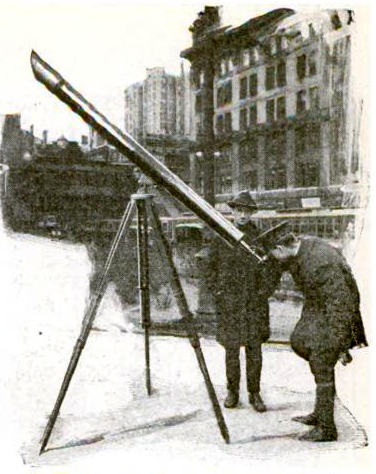
A "street corner astronomer" at Manhattan's 42nd Street, 1921

In the 19th and into the later 20th century, several hawkers made a living from sidewalk astronomy as a "telescope man", charging a small fee to peer through their instrument. Inventor Heinrich Göbel filled this role in the 1850s and 1860s, operating in Union Square.

Arthur F. Nursey, profiled in Popular Science in 1921 amid the appearance of Comet Pons–Winnecke , made a living in the same park and when he died in 1932 while gazing skyward his obituary made The New York Times. A 1922 piece in Cosmopolitan by urban observer O. O. McIntyre highlights "Old Dan, the telescope man" of the park (later fictionalized in F&SF), and a John Dos Passos play of 1926 also features as a character a telescope man in Union Square.

A travel guide of 1950 mentions a telescope man who, when the sky is not starry, pivots to charging for a view of the site of the Empire State Building B-25 crash.

== Amateur association ==
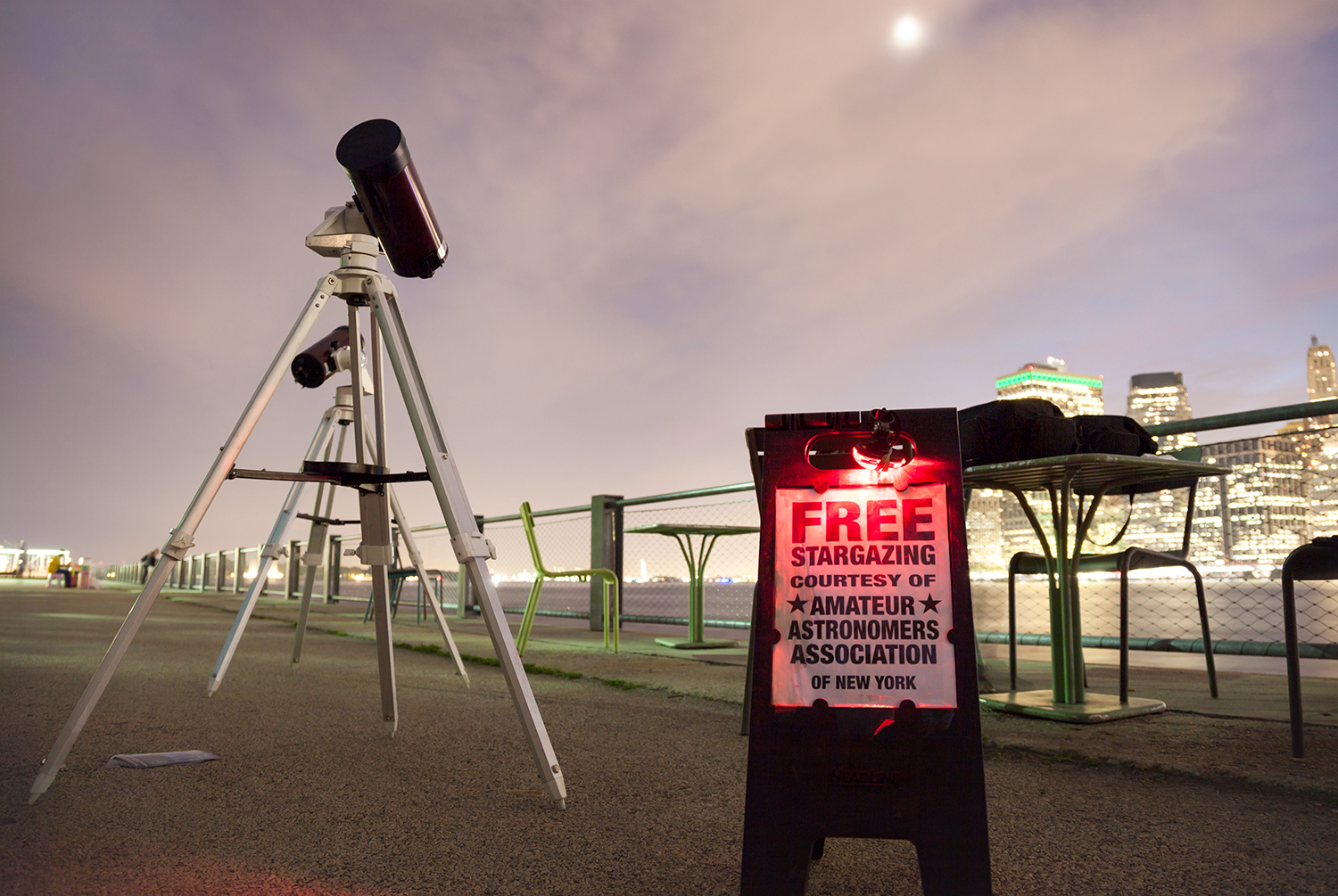
2019 in Brooklyn

The Amateur Astronomers Association of New York was established in 1927. Its original bulletin was The Amateur Astronomer which began publication in 1929, was succeeded in 1935 by the Hayden Planetarium's The Sky, and then the latter publication was merged into Sky and Telescope in 1941.

In the 21st century, it continues to engage in free sidewalk astronomy as public outreach at popular locations like the High Line and in city parks and in star parties at relative dark-sky locations like Floyd Bennett Field, and is working to establish a public observatory for the city.
