= Columbia University Science Honors Program =

The Columbia University Science Honors Program (SHP) is a science program at Columbia University in New York City that runs during the school year for approximately 300 to 400 high-school students in tenth, eleventh, and twelfth grade.

== History ==
The Columbia University Science Honors Program was founded in 1958 by assistant dean of the Faculty of Engineering and Applied Sciences Donald Barr. Funding for the program initially came from the Ford Foundation and the National Science Foundation. The goal of the program was to combat "enforced mediocrity" in American public schools according to Columbia University President Grayson Kirk. Later, in the 1980s, the launching of Sputnik in October 1957, and the fear that the Soviet Union would eclipse the United States in scientific knowledge was ascribed as an important reason for the start of the program.

During Barr's tenure, the program admitted students as young as ten years old. By 1963, the number of high school students enrolled in the program had grown to 400, with students traveling from as far away as northern Connecticut and Pennsylvania to attend Saturday course sessions. Barr ran the program until 1964, when he left Columbia to become head of the Dalton School.

Physics professor Allan Sachs directed the program from 1970 until his death in 1989. Cuts to the National Science Foundation in 1982 led to a $48,000 loss of funding for the program.

The program was run by Professor Allan Blaer from 1989 until 2016, at which point administration of the program was taken over by Senior Lecturer Jeremy Dodd.

As of 2026, the program is led by Paul Blaer.

== Academics ==
SHP has offered courses spanning the full range of the pure and applied sciences, from organic chemistry, neuroscience and physiological psychology, to computer programming in Java and calculus in the complex plane, as well as introductions to special relativity, quantum theory, particle physics and physical cosmology.

== Administration ==
Classes are held each Saturday throughout the academic year, from September through May at Pupin Hall, Havemeyer Hall and Mudd Hall on Columbia's Morningside Heights campus. There were previously no tuition charges for the program; however, beginning in the 2022–2023 school year, a fee of $300 per semester was implemented. Tuition was increased to $350 per semester beginning in Fall 2025 and $450 per semester for 2026–2027. Tuition waivers are available for students facing financial hardship. The program receives funding from the university, and donations from corporations and foundations, as well individual donations from students. Students must provide their own transportation to and from campus.

== Admission ==
Participants are currently required to live within a 75-mile radius of Columbia's campus.

In order to apply, students must do so online on the SHP website. Students must submit transcripts, a recommendation by a science or math teacher, and an essay. The main component of the admissions process is a three-hour examination taken online that contains questions in both mathematics and science. The exam has three parts, consisting of a 50 question "easy" mathematics section, a 75 question survey science section, and a 15 question "challenge" mathematics section.

== Former faculty ==
- Brian Greene
- Polykarp Kusch, winner of the Nobel Prize in Physics
- Tsung Dao Lee, winner of the Nobel Prize in Physics
- William J. McGill, President of Columbia University
- Margaret Mead, cultural anthropologist
- Lloyd Motz
- Brent Stockwell

== Former students ==
- Sylvain Cappell, professor of mathematics at New York University’s Courant Institute
- Barry Simon, professor of mathematics and theoretical physics at Caltech
- Richard Stallman, creator of GNU, attended from 1967 to 1969
