= Columbia University tunnels =

System of service tunnels between buildings

Coordinates: 40.809°N 73.961°W

Columbia University in New York City has an extensive tunnel system underneath its Morningside Heights campus connecting many of its buildings, used by the university as conduits for steam, electricity, telecommunications, and other infrastructure. Throughout their history, the tunnels have also been used for other purposes, mostly centering around transportation. During the first half of the 20th century, they were used by students to avoid aboveground traffic. When the university housed the Manhattan Project, they were allegedly used to move radioactive material between buildings. During the Columbia University protests of 1968, students used the tunnels to facilitate their occupation of buildings on campus.

Throughout their history, the tunnels have been thoroughly explored by generations of students, and have been the subject of numerous campus legends. Though sections have been cordoned off by the university since the 1960s, either in response to the 1968 protests or rampant campus typewriter theft, many parts can still be legally accessed. Similar tunnels also exist under the affiliated Barnard College.

== History ==
Enrico Fermi, John R. Dunning, and Dana P. Mitchell in front of the cyclotron in the basement of Pupin Hall

Columbia University's current Morningside Heights campus in Manhattan was dedicated in 1896. The oldest section predates the campus dedication; it was built when the land was owned by the Bloomingdale Insane Asylum, which used the tunnels to transport patients between buildings. In the section under Uris Hall and the Engineering Terrace, the deepest portion of the tunnels, running 50 feet (15 m) underground, furnaces and tracks still remain in the tunnels from when they were used to transport coal around the university for heating purposes. The largest sections of the tunnel system emanate from the university's power plant under the Sherman Fairchild Center.

According to student accounts, during the Manhattan Project, the tunnels were used by Columbia scientists to transport radioactive material between buildings. Prior to its removal in 2008, the basement of Pupin Hall, which was only accessible through the tunnels, contained a Manhattan Project-era cyclotron built by John R. Dunning.

In 1953, Columbia closed off the portion of 116th Street that bisected its campus. Prior to this, the tunnels were commonly used as pedestrian thoroughfares in order to avoid traffic, and were used by students well into the 1960s. During the Cold War, portions of the tunnels were used as nuclear shelters. Some time before the construction of Ferris Booth Hall, the tunnels also housed a shooting range beneath Kent Hall used by the Columbia Rifle Team.

During the 1968 student strike, student staff at WKCR, Columbia's radio station, used the tunnels to break into telephone distribution panel rooms and seize the university's telephone system in order to allow reporters to communicate with station headquarters through campus phones. Students also made use of the tunnels to travel between buildings occupied by strikers and to bring them supplies. Though the tunnels helped students occupy many of the buildings on campus, they were also accessible to the agents of the administration; university staff and eventually the police used them to capture and remove the protestors, with the added benefit that they could do so away from press coverage.

In the 1960s, many of the tunnels' passages were sealed off by the university administration. This has been reported to be either in response to the 1968 protests or an epidemic of typewriter theft from the administration facilitated by the tunnels, while it has been rumored by students that they were closed due to leftover radiation from the Manhattan Project. As of 2015, many tunnels, including the one connecting the freshman dorms John Jay Hall, Wallach Hall, and Hartley Hall, are still accessible. As of 2009, the tunnels under Barnard College, the university's affiliated women's liberal arts college, are still open for pedestrian use.

== Traditions ==
...the Columbia tunnel holds a high place in student regard. On its walls may be seen penciled inscriptions of men who long since have risen to importance in the affairs of the nation. Class after class has wandered through its passages, tracing the year numerals on the dust and leaving hieroglyphic commentaries on certain unpopular members of the faculty.

— "Columbia University Catacombs", The New York Times, 1932

Over the course of Columbia University's history there have been many stories about tunnels under the campus, including one of a rumored passage across Broadway connecting the Columbia and Barnard College campuses. The New York Times reported in 1932 that several undergraduates attempted to find such a tunnel in order to spy on the secrecy-shrouded Barnard Greek Games, but were unsuccessful. Urban legends also tell of a freshman in the early 20th century who disappeared into the tunnels and was forgotten until he failed to advance to receive his diploma. Despite having never attended any classes, he supposedly graduated summa cum laude and was considered for Phi Beta Kappa. More recently, it has been rumored that the tunnels are used as a graveyard for underperforming graduates as part of Lee Bollinger's "extermination plan" for alumni who fail to donate to the school.

The tunnels have been explored by generations of Columbia students and extensively mapped. Student activist Ken Hechtman was known to have explored the tunnels, and was expelled in 1987 after stealing uranium-238, chloroform, mercury, and pure caffeine from Pupin Hall using the tunnels. Other explorers included Steve Duncan and Miru Kim, who has used the tunnels as a backdrop for her photography. According to her 1932 memoir, The Fun of It, Amelia Earhart was "familiar with all the forbidden underground passageways which connected the different buildings of the University" when she was a student at Columbia in 1920.

== In popular culture ==
The Columbia tunnel system has been described as perhaps "the largest of any university in America" after that of MIT, and "probably the most famous". Given their history with the Manhattan Project and the 1968 protests, they have been featured in numerous action novels, including Once a Spy by Keith Thomson, Songs of Innocence by Charles Ardai, and The Return by Joseph Helmreich. They have also appeared in several fictional and non-fictional accounts of the 1968 protests, including A Time to Stir: Columbia '68, edited by Paul Cronin and 1968: Dreams of Revolution by Wilber W. Caldwell.
