= Peter Englert =

Former chancellor of the University of Hawaiʻi

- Occupations: Academic administrator Geophysicist; Nuclear chemist
- Known for: NASA Mars Observer mission NASA Mars Odyssey mission Antarctic dry valleys research

Academic background
- Education: Three degrees in nuclear chemistry
- Alma mater: University of Cologne

Academic work
- Institutions: San Jose State University (1983–1995); Victoria University of Wellington (1995–2002); University of Hawaiʻi at Mānoa (2002–2005); Quest University Canada (2015–2017)

Peter Englert was, until May 8, 2017, the President & Vice Chancellor of Quest University Canada. Englert's research background includes geophysical studies and space research. He participated in NASA's Mars Observer and Mars Odyssey Missions, and was an elected board member of the International Association of Universities. He recently co-authored work on antarctic dry valleys.

Englert is a former Chancellor of the University of Hawaiʻi at Mānoa, serving from 2002 until 2005. He was appointed by then-UH President Evan Dobelle. Before coming to the University of Hawaii, Englert served as Pro Vice Chancellor and Dean of Science, Architecture and Design at Victoria University of Wellington, New Zealand.

He has earned three academic degrees in nuclear chemistry from the University of Cologne, Germany. He was a faculty member and administrator at San Jose State University in California from 1983-1995, and served at Victoria University of Wellington from 1995-2002.

On May 19, 2015 it was announced that as of August 1, 2015 Peter Englert would succeed David J. Helfand. Helfand stepped down from his position after seven years to focus on his work at Columbia University. Englert was the fourth president and vice-chancellor of Quest University Canada.

In May 2017, Quest's Board of Governors dismissed Peter Englert.
