= Erling Kagge =

Norwegian explorer

Erling Kagge (born January 15, 1963) is a Norwegian explorer, publisher, author, philosopher, lawyer, art collector and entrepreneur.

== Three Poles Challenge ==
Erling Kagge is the first person in history to reach the North Pole, South Pole and the summit of Mount Everest on foot.

In 1990, Erling Kagge and Børge Ousland became the first to reach the North Pole unsupported. The expedition started from Ellesmere Island on March 8, 1990, and reached the North Pole 58 days later on May 4, 1990. They travelled approximately 800 kilometers on skis, pulling their supplies on sledges.

In 1992 and 1993, Kagge completed the first unsupported and solo expedition to the South Pole, covering the 814-mile (1,310 km) route in 50 days. Kagge started at the northern edge of Berkner Island and had no radio or telephone contact to the outside world for the duration of this expedition, which was featured on the cover of Time magazine on March 1, 1993.

In 1994, Kagge summited Mount Everest, thus becoming the first person to complete the "Three Poles Challenge" on foot.

Kagge has also sailed across the Atlantic twice, rounded Cape Horn and sailed to Antarctica and back.

Kagge continues to do expeditions, although with a lower profile than in the 1990s. In 2010, Kagge crossed Vatnajökull ice-cap in Iceland with Børge Ousland and Haraldur Örn Ólafsson.

In 2023, together with Børge Ousland and Håvard Tjora, he became the first to cross White Island on skis, an island in the Svalbard Archipelago.

== Career ==
Kagge has a law degree from the University of Oslo. From September 1990 to September 1992 Kagge worked as a lawyer for Norwegian industrial conglomerate Norsk Hydro.

After his record-breaking feat of reaching the "three poles", Kagge attended Cambridge University to study philosophy for three terms. In 1996, he founded the eponymous Oslo-based publishing house, Kagge Forlag. In 2000 Kagge Forlag acquired one of Norway's oldest publishing companies, J.M. Stenersens Forlag. Kagge and Stenersens publish approximately 120 new titles annually. It is Norway's largest publisher of nonfiction. In 2021 Kagge sold his publishing company and in 2025 he left his position as publisher.

Kagge has written nine books on exploration, philosophy and art collecting, which have been translated into 42 languages. He has written for the Financial Times, The New York Times and The Guardian.

== Urban Exploration ==
In 2010 Kagge and urban historian and photographer Steve Duncan descended into the sewers, subways, trains and water tunnels of New York City – crossing the city alpine-style for five days and nights, from the Bronx, via Manhattan, to the shore of the Atlantic Ocean.

== Published works ==
Kagge's most recent books are Manhattan Underground, A Poor Collectors Guide to Buying Great Art, Silence in the Age of Noise, Walking – One Step at a Time and Philosophy for Polar Explorers. Silence: In the Age of Noise was broadcast as BBC Radio 4's Book of the Week in January 2019. The Guardian named it one of the top ten books on silence. On Point, NPR, put Silence on their list for Best Books of 2017 and American Booksellers Association nominated it as Book of the Year, 2018. The New York Times has described Erling Kagge as "a fascinating man. He's a philosophical adventurer or perhaps an adventurous philosopher", and the Financial Times identified Kagge as "something of a Renaissance man".

Kagge has been on the cover of Time Magazine and L'Uomo Vogue.

== Space Exploration ==
In 2022, Kagge was engaged by the European Space Agency to provide an independent and objective assessment on the geopolitical, economic and societal relevance of human and robotic space exploration for Europe. The 12-person strong star-studded group, known as the “High Level Advisory Group” (HLAG), presented its independent report on the state of European space exploration to the 315th session of the ESA Council at ESA Headquarters in Paris on 23rd of March 2023.

== Personal life ==
Kagge lives in Oslo and has three daughters: Nor, Ingrid and Solveig. Their mother, Jorunn Anne Salthella, died of pancreatic cancer in 2022.

Kagge is a leading collector of international contemporary art. Five major European museums have dedicated shows of his collection in the last ten years: Astrup Fearnley Museum for Modern Art in Oslo, Fondacion van Gogh Arles in France, Sala Santander in Madrid, Museion in Bolzano, Italy and KODE in Bergen, Norway.

== Bibliography ==
- Kagge, Erling (1990). Nordpolen: Det siste kappløpet. J.W. Cappelens forlag. ISBN 82-02-12406-9.
- Kagge, Erling (1993). Alene til Sydpolen. Cappelen. ISBN 82-02-14087-0.
- Kagge, Erling (1994). Pole to Pole & Beyond. N. W. Damm & Son. ISBN 82-517-8082-9.
- Kagge, Erling (2007). Philosophy for Polar Explorers: What They Don't Teach You in School. Pushkin Press. ISBN 1-901285-69-3.
- Kagge, Erling (2015). A Poor Collector's Guide to Buying Great Art. Kagge Forlag
- Kagge, Erling (2015). Manhattan Underground. World Editions.
- Kagge, Erling (2017). Silence: In the Age of Noise. Pantheon. ISBN 15-247-3323-7.
- Kagge, Erling (2019). Walking: One Step At a Time. Knopf Doubleday ISBN 1524747858.
- Kagge, Erling (2019). Philosophy for Polar Explorers: An Adventurer´s Guide to Surviving Winter. Viking. ISBN 9780241404867.
- Kagge, Erling (2025). The North Pole: The History of an Obsession. Viking. ISBN 9780241645833.

== See also ==
- Explorers Grand Slam
