= Lloyd Motz =

American astronomer

Lloyd Motz (June 5, 1909, Susquehanna, Pennsylvania – March 14, 2004, New York City) was an American astronomer.

== Biography ==
Born in Pennsylvania, Motz graduated from the City College of New York 1930 and earned a Ph.D. in physics from Columbia University in 1936. Motz began teaching at Columbia the same year he completed his Ph.D., but over the years also taught courses at the City College of New York, Queens College, Polytechnic University, and The New School. From 1959 to 1992 he mentored in a program he initiated, the Columbia University Science Honors Program for high school students. (His course for ninth graders on 'astronomy to the three-body problem' was known as "Motz for Tots.") College courses he taught included introductory astronomy, astronomical physics, and celestial mechanics. During the 1970s he hosted a television program, Exploration of the Universe. He founded the Phi Beta Kappa chapter at Columbia's School of General Studies. A scholarship was established at Columbia in Motz's honor in 1996.

Motz was noted for having defeated Enrico Fermi in a tennis match, and then discussing not his strategy (which was to play the net), but to give a speech on how the conservation of momentum applied to tennis balls and the tightness of strings on the racquets.

== Publications ==
Lloyd Motz was the author of 21 books on astronomy, including The Constellations (1988, ISBN 0-385-17600-7) co-authored with Carol Nathanson. He also teamed with Jefferson Hane Weaver in authoring books on astronomy, general science, and mathematics, to include The World of Physics: The Einstein Universe and the Bohr Atom (1987, ISBN 0671499300), The Concepts of Science: From Newton to Einstein (1988, ISBN 9780306428722), The Unfolding Universe: A Stellar Journey (1989, ISBN 0306432641), The Story of Physics (1989, ISBN 9780306430763), Conquering Mathematics: From Arithmetic to Calculus (1991, ISBN 0306437686), The Story of Astronomy (1995, ISBN 9780306450907). Some of his books were translated into other languages.

== Death ==
He died in 2004 in New York City. He is survived by his wife for 70 years, Minnie, son, Dr. Robin Motz, daughter Julie Motz, grandchildren Jeremy, Nicole and Benjamin and great granddaughter Isabella. Great Grandson Aidan Wilson.
