= Barnard Greek Games =

Barnard College tradition

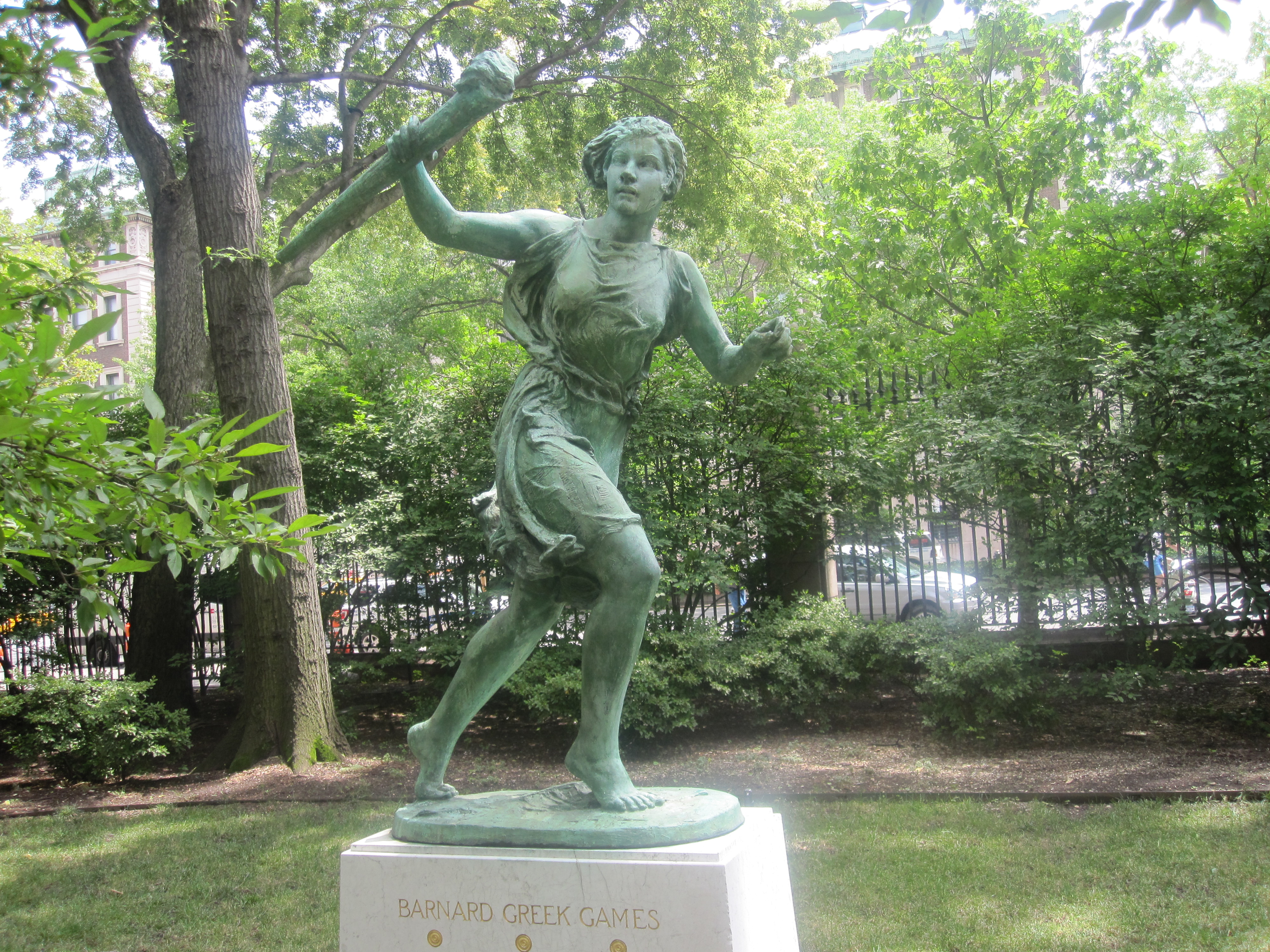
The Barnard Greek Games statue was donated to the college by the Class of 1905 to commemorate the 25th anniversary of the first games.

The Barnard Greek Games are a tradition at Barnard College, a women's college affiliated with Columbia University in New York City, New York. They were first held in 1903, when the Class of 1905 challenged the Class of 1906 to an informal athletic contest, and would be held continuously until the Columbia University protests of 1968, when the games stopped entirely. They would be revived several times after 1968, first in 1989 as part of the college's centennial celebrations. Though they began as a competition between the freshman and sophomore classes, the games would eventually expand to include the entire student body.

The games seek to emulate sports in ancient Greece with costumes, sets, and ceremonies. Traditional events have included the recitation of Greek poetry, dance, hoop rolling, chariot racing, and a torch race. However, the games have also included events such as lawn tennis, field hockey, and capture the flag. Prior to 1968, the games had traditionally barred men from viewing them; this has led to at least one instance of Columbia men unsuccessfully attempting to find a passage connecting the Columbia and Barnard campuses in the Columbia University tunnel system in order to spy on the games.
