= Quest University =

Defunct university in Squamish, British Columbia, Canada

Coordinates: 49°44′24.64″N 123°6′29.75″W

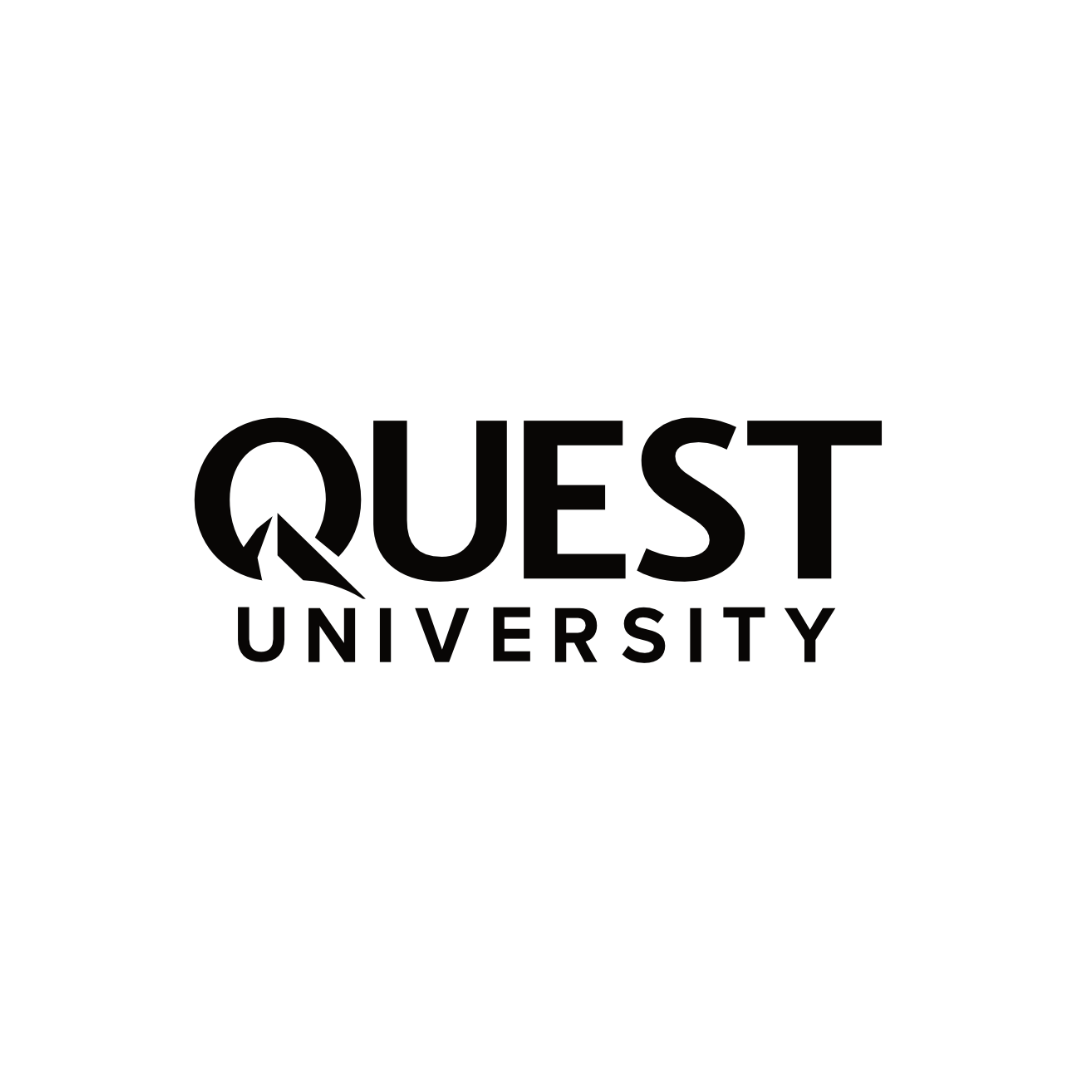
- Other name: Quest University Canada
- Former name: Sea to Sky University (2002–2005)
- Type: Private, not-for-profit liberal arts university
- Active: 2002 (Note: The university did not open to students until 2007.)–April 2023
- Affiliations: CUP
- Chancellor: Chief Dale Harry
- President: Arthur Coren
- Location: Squamish, British Columbia, Canada
- Colours: Dark green; gray; copper; aqua
- Mascot: Kermode Bear
- Website: questu.ca

Quest University (officially Quest University Canada) was a private, not-for-profit, secular liberal arts and sciences university located in Squamish, British Columbia, Canada. The university opened in September 2007 with an inaugural class of 73 and suspended academic operations in April 2023. The university had an enrolment of around 200 students around the time of its closing. The campus was sold to Capilano University for $63.2M who began operating at the campus in Fall 2024.

Quest's curriculum was considered unconventional. It used the block plan, adapted and modified from the block plan at Colorado College. Students needed to complete 32 blocks to graduate. Classes were seminar-style and capped at 20 students. There were five divisions (Life Sciences, Physical Sciences, Arts & Humanities, Mathematics, and Social Sciences) instead of traditional departments. In lieu of declaring a major, students wrote a personalized Question. Studies culminate in a major work called a Keystone project. Upon graduation—usually after four years study—students were awarded a degree of Bachelor of Arts and Sciences.

The campus was located on a 60-acre (24.3 ha) hilltop on the edge of Garibaldi Provincial Park. It was approximately 75 km (47 miles) from Vancouver and 60 km (37 miles) from Whistler, British Columbia. Quest University Canada was fully accredited and approved by the Degree Quality Assessment Board (DQAB) under the British Columbia Ministry of Advanced Education. Quest was also registered as a British Columbia Education Quality Assurance (EQA) approved post-secondary institution.

== History ==
Quest University Canada was originally created as the Sea to Sky University in May 2002, when the Legislative Assembly of British Columbia passed the Sea to Sky University Act. One of the purposes cited in the act was to create a university that would "offer a rigorous and well-rounded university education in the arts and sciences with a global focus." Quest was the brainchild of David Strangway, who, after his retirement as president of the University of British Columbia, wished to create a new kind of university where undergraduates guided their own studies in close cooperation with faculty.

Together with Quest founding directors Blake Bromley and Peter Ufford, Strangway formed the Sea to Sky Foundation and began soliciting contributions and searching for land. The foundation received grants from the J.W. McConnell Foundation, R. Howard Webster Foundation, and the Stewart and Marilyn Blusson Foundation, which allowed it to begin hiring staff and faculty and launch the university's operations. Bromley, a lawyer specializing in charitable law, recruited many wealthy clients to donate shares to the foundation, many of which were sold back to donors after a charitable tax receipt had been issued, a move that triggered an investigation from the Canada Revenue Agency. In October 2005, the Sea to Sky University changed its name to Quest University Canada. The school officially opened its doors to students in 2007, becoming the first private, secular university in Canada.

In 2011, Quest graduated its first class. In February 2018 the University cancelled its athletics program, the Quest Kermodes, citing the need to cut costs to reduce its high debt load.

On October 29, 2020, Quest University announced that an agreement had been signed with Primacorp Ventures, an investment company which owns and manages commercial and educational real estate. Under the agreement, Quest would sell their campus lands to Primacorp and then lease them back in order to continue operations.

The university closed at the end of the 2022–2023 academic year, when all academic operations ceased. On August 16, 2023, the government of British Columbia issued a press release announcing that Capilano University had purchased Quest University's campus for $63.2M with supplemental funding provided by the government of British Columbia. CapU Squamish began offering courses at the campus in Fall 2024.

== Leadership ==
=== President and vice-chancellors ===
1. David Strangway (2002–2007)
2. Thomas L. Wood (2007)
3. Dean Duperron (2007) - interim
4. David Helfand (2007–2015)
5. Peter Englert (2015–2017)
6. George Iwama (2017–2022)
7. Arthur Coren (2022–2023)

=== Chancellors ===
1. Peter Webster (2017)
2. Chief Dale Harry (2022–2023)

== Academics ==
Quest's curriculum and educational philosophy were different than most universities. Its approach was multidisciplinary and the school did not have traditional departments. It offers one degree for all students, the Bachelor of Arts and Sciences. There were no lecture halls. Every class had a maximum of 20 students. The faculty hold terminal degrees in their field, but were known as Tutors rather than Professors. There is no tenure system at Quest.

Other distinguishing features included the Foundation and Concentration Programs, block plan scheduling, a Question instead of a conventional major, and a final Keystone project.

=== Foundation program ===
In their first two years of study, students enrolled in 16 Foundation courses. After completing the mandatory Cornerstone and Rhetoric classes, they went on to take 14 courses chosen from five major divisions: Social Sciences, Life Sciences, Physical Sciences, Mathematics, and Arts & Humanities. They needed also fulfil a language requirement.

Toward the end of the Foundation Program, students took a course called Question. Working with an instructor and a faculty mentor, they developed a statement of Question: a proposal for how they would study a topic of particular interest to them. The Question was in lieu of a conventional major, serving as the basis for the remaining two years of study, and inspired the student's Keystone project.

=== Concentration program ===
The remaining two years were known as the Concentration Program. With the help of a faculty advisor, students designed a personalized program, which consists of four principal elements:

1. a statement of the Question
2. a course plan
3. a list of related readings
4. a Keystone project

Along with their Concentration (or Focus) Courses, students took between one and four Experiential Learning Blocks, hands-on work that could take place in the private sector, not-for-profit, government or many other settings. Quest stated that the purpose of Experiential Learning was to show students how their interests manifested in the world and helped them gain direct experience. Students also take three or more electives.

=== Block plan ===
Quest operated on the block plan, where students took one course at a time, meeting every weekday for 3.5 weeks. The academic year was divided into two terms. Fall term usually ran from September to mid-December, and spring term typically ran from January to the end of April. There were four blocks per term, and full-time students took eight blocks per year.

Quest claimed that the block plan allowed scheduling flexibility: students could decide which blocks were spent on courses and which were spent traveling, working, or exploring other pursuits. The school also noted that block scheduling permitted faculty to run "field studies", off-campus learning experiences that could run for several weeks. Many field studies involved fees, which ranged from nominal to significant. Quest also offered Study Abroad. Students could spend one or two academic terms at a selection of partner universities around the world.

=== Keystone ===
To graduate, students needed complete a Keystone project, the culmination of their studies. A Keystone could take various forms: a scientific paper, video documentary, art installation, photography exhibit, work of fiction, or research paper. Students presented their Keystones to their peers, faculty and community. A few outstanding Keystones were granted Distinction, and some were chosen as Showcases that the students present to a wide audience in a formal setting. The university provided ample services to prepare students to justify, to graduate school admissions officers, their Keystone as the equivalent to a major.

=== Rankings and reputation ===
Quest University Canada had posted at or near the top of Canada's foremost poll of student opinion, the National Survey of Student Engagement (NSSE).

Quest was not included in Macleans University Rankings because its enrolment was below 1000 students, the magazine's cut-off. However, Macleans conducted an interview with then-President David Helfand in 2013 and had published several articles about the school over the years. Quest had also been noted in The Globe and Mail's University Report.

== Campus ==
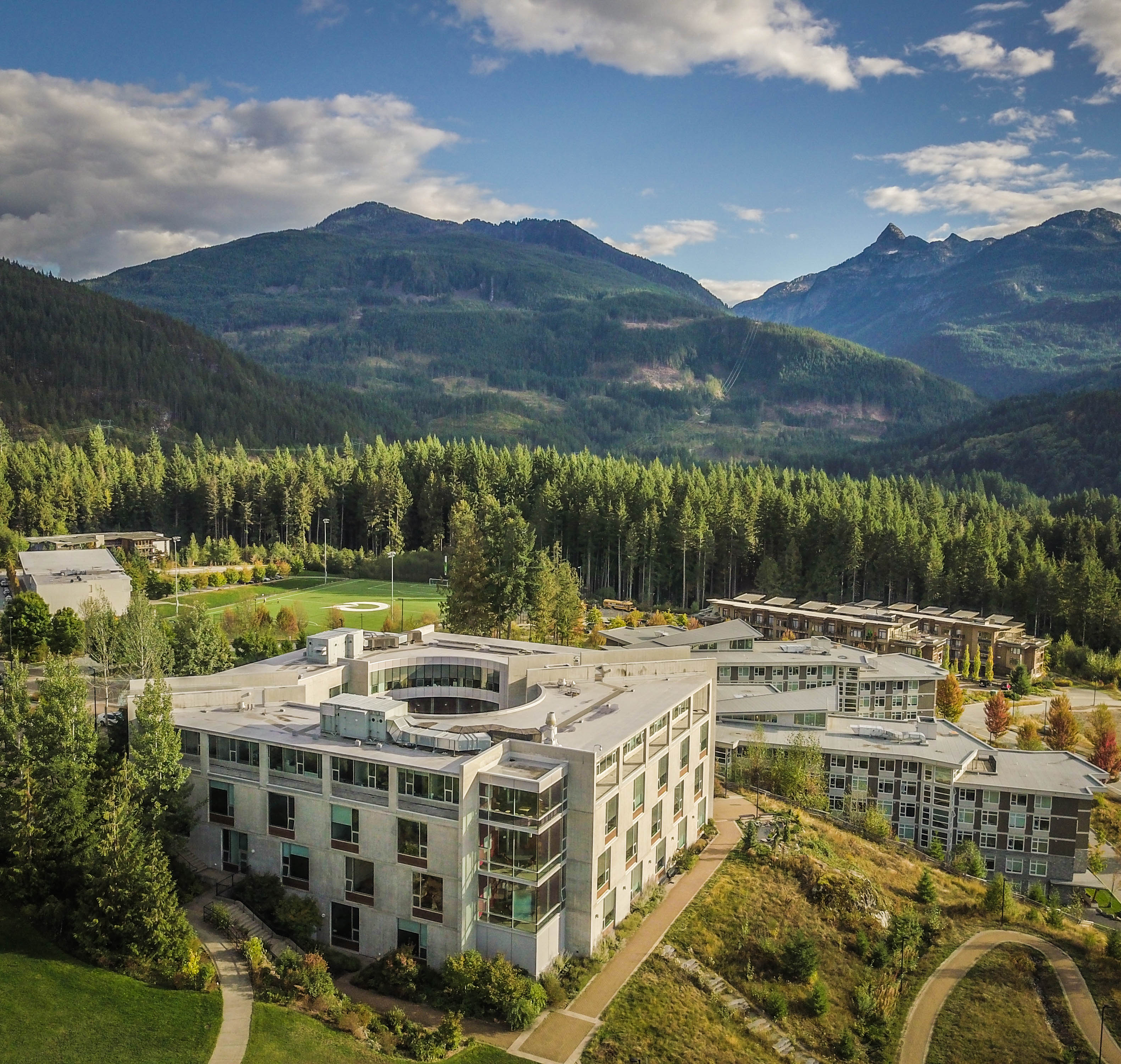
Quest University Canada Academic Building Aerial View

The campus had been named one of top 10 most beautiful campuses in Canada. It is built on 60-acre (24.3 ha) a hilltop in Squamish, BC.

Quest's campus included an academic building, a library building, a "RecPlex" which contains a full gymnasium facility, and a services building that included a cafeteria. There were five main student residences, each priced the same as an average Canadian university and with nearly twice the floor space. Only two were by the university students. The others were rented out to a high school which used the campus daily.

== Cost and financial aid ==
Because Quest was private, it received no government funding at any level. Its operations were funded by tuition and private donations. According to its website, full-time tuition for Canadian students and permanent residents was C$21,000. For international students, it was $35,000. Room and board could add another $15,000, depending on the student's selections.

Eligible students could receive financial aid, including scholarships that range from $2000 to full tuition; bursaries; and a Work-Study program on campus. Quest also offered substantial scholarships through its LEAP program (see below). Quest was an approved post-secondary institution to administer government student loans from all provinces and territories in Canada. Quest was also an approved post-secondary institution to administer certain programs out of the US.

== Leaders in Elite Athletics and Performance program ==
Quest's Leaders in Elite Athletics & Performance program (LEAP) was structured to accommodate the needs of elite athletes and performers who wish to pursue a postsecondary education. LEAP students were afforded extra flexibility in housing, billing, and course scheduling. They could take more years to graduate and were eligible for LEAP scholarships.

Notable LEAP students and alumni include:

- Jack Burke (professional road cyclist for Team H&R Block)
- Samuel Edney (luger; Olympian)
- Darren Gardner (snowboarder; Olympian)
- Rosalind Groenwoud (freestyle skier; Olympian, Winter X Games Champion)
- Keltie Hansen (freestyle skier; Olympian)
- Leah Kirchmann (professional road cyclist for Team Sunweb; Olympian)
- Simon Nessman (international model)

== Notable faculty members ==
- Glen Van Brummelen (mathematics scholar; past President of the Canadian Society for History and Philosophy of Mathematics)
- Richard Hoshino (mathematics professor; winner of the 2017 Adrien Pouliot Award for Significant and Sustained Contributions to Mathematics Education in Canada; former coach for Canadians competing in the International Mathematical Olympiad)

== See also ==
- List of universities in British Columbia
- Higher education in British Columbia
