= Elizabeth Blanton =

American astronomer

Elizabeth Lyon Blanton (born 1970) is an American astronomer whose research combines observations of galaxy clusters on a broad range of spectra including radio astronomy, X-ray astronomy, infrared astronomy, and visible-light astronomy. She is an associate professor of astronomy at Boston University, where she directs the Institute for Astrophysical Research.

== Education and career ==
Blanton graduated from Vassar College in 1993, with a bachelor's degree in astronomy. Her undergraduate thesis research on observation of a type II-P supernova, supervised by Frederick R. Chromey, won the undergraduate thesis award of the Astronomical Society of New York. She went to Columbia University for graduate study in astronomy, earning a master's degree in 1996 and completing her Ph.D. in 2000. Her dissertation involved radio astronomy of galaxy clusters, and was supervised by David Helfand.

After postdoctoral research at the University of Virginia, she joined Boston University in 2004 as Clare Boothe Luce Assistant Professor of Astronomy, and was promoted to associate professor in 2013. She became director of the Institute for Astrophysical Research in 2015.

== Recognition ==
Blanton was named a Legacy Fellow of the American Astronomical Society in 2020.
