= Montreal Mirror =

Former English weekly newspaper in Montreal

- The cover of the final edition (June 21, 2012) of the Montreal Mirror
- Type: Alternative Newsweekly
- Format: Tabloid
- Owner: Quebecor Media
- Publisher: Communications Gratte-Ciel Ltée
- Editor: Alastair Sutherland
- Founded: June 20, 1985; 40 years ago
- Ceased publication: June 22, 2012; 13 years ago
- Political alignment: Centre-left
- Headquarters: 465 McGill Street, 3rd Floor, Suite 300, Montreal, Quebec
- Circulation: 70,000
- Sister newspapers: ici
- ISSN: 0833-8086
- OCLC number: 15997017
- Website: MontrealMirror.com (via the Internet Archive)

Montreal Mirror or just Mirror was a free English language alternative newsweekly based in Montreal, Quebec, Canada which was distributed every Thursday. It had a circulation of 70,000 and reached a quarter of a million readers per week.

The Montreal Mirror was first published in June 1985, the initial print run being 20,000 copies, the publication became a weekly in September 1989. It was bought by media giant Quebecor in 1997. It was published by Communications Gratte-Ciel Ltée.

On June 22, 2012, Sun Media (the division of Quebecor that the Mirror belonged to) announced that the paper would be ceasing publication effective immediately.

== See also ==
- List of newspapers in Canada
- Ken Hechtman
