= Rose Center for Earth and Space =

Part of the American Museum of Natural History

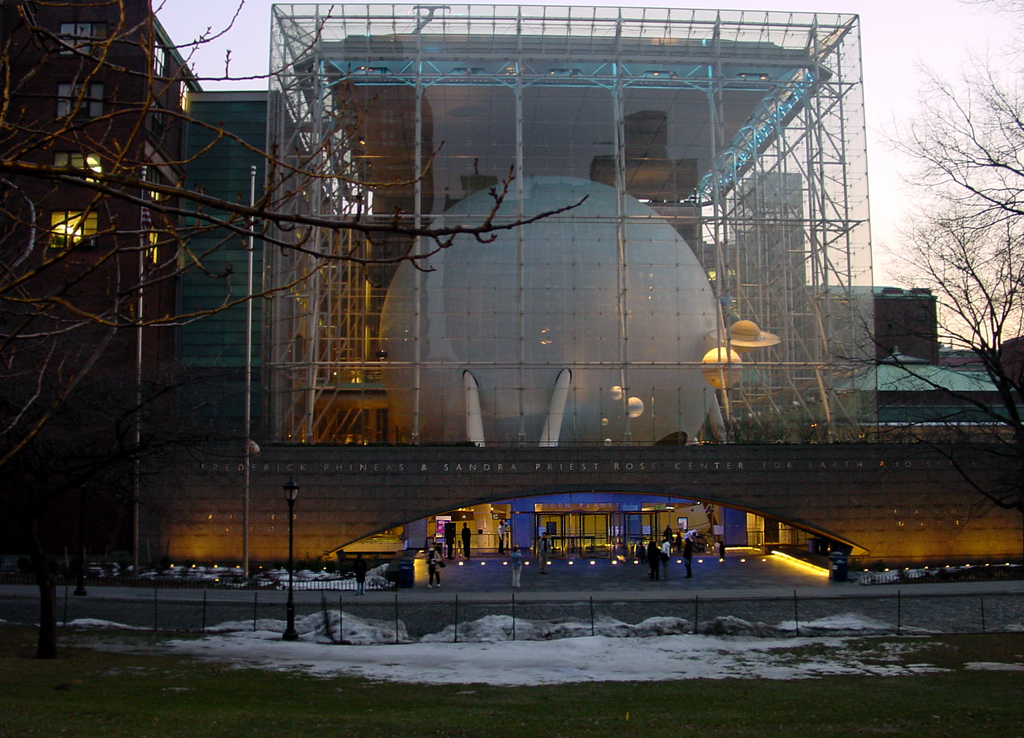

- Location within New York City Location within New York Location within the United States
- Established: 1935
- Location: 75-208 79th Street Central Park West
- Coordinates: 40°46′53.53″N 73°58′23.69″W
- Type: Natural history
- Director: Neil deGrasse Tyson

The Frederick Phineas and Sandra Priest Rose Center for Earth and Space is a part of the American Museum of Natural History in New York City. The main entrance is located on the northern side of the museum on 81st Street near Central Park West in Manhattan's Upper West Side. Completed in 2000, it includes the Hayden Planetarium, which was originally opened in 1935. Neil deGrasse Tyson is its first and, to date, only director.

== History ==
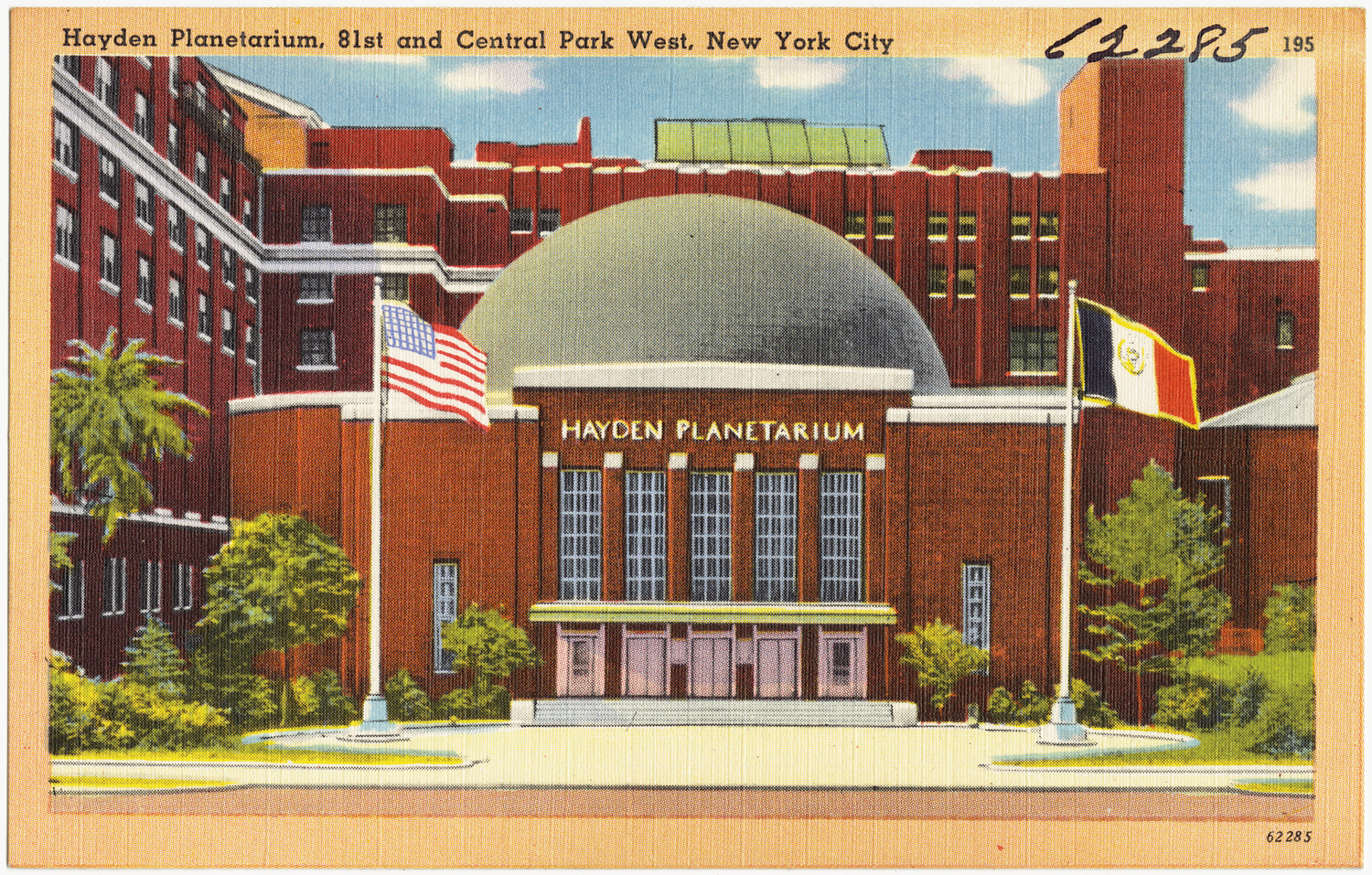
Hayden Planetarium, circa 1935–45

The center is an extensive reworking of the former Hayden Planetarium, whose first projector, dedicated in 1935, had 2 successors previous to the current one.

The original Hayden Planetarium was founded in 1933 with a donation by banker and philanthropist Charles Hayden of Hayden, Stone & Co. It was designed by architects Trowbridge & Livingston and opened in 1935. Its construction was funded by a $650,000 loan from the Reconstruction Finance Corporation and a $150,000 donation from Charles Hayden. Its mission was to give the public "a more lively and sincere appreciation of the magnitude of the universe... and for the wonderful things which are daily occurring in the universe." Joseph M. Chamberlain, hired as an assistant curator in 1952, became Chairman of the Planetarium in 1956. In 1960, a Zeiss Mark IV projector was installed, followed by a Zeiss Mark VI projector and new seats in 1993.

In January 1997, the original Hayden Planetarium was closed and demolished. In August 1999, a new, customized Zeiss Mark IX projector was installed, accompanied by a digital dome projection system that provides a 3-D visualization of the universe based on images generated in real time by a Silicon Graphics supercomputer. Before the building opened, a black tie fundraiser was held at the nearly finished museum to celebrate the millennium on December 31, 1999. Philippe Petit, best known for his 1974 tightrope walk between the Twin Towers of the World Trade Center, and Eartha Kitt performed at the millennium event.

On February 19, 2000, the $210 million Frederick Phineas and Sandra Priest Rose Center for Earth and Space, containing the new Hayden Planetarium, opened to the public. The Rose Center was designed by James Polshek and Todd H. Schliemann of Polshek Partnership Architects (now Ennead Architects) with the exhibition design by Ralph Appelbaum Associates. The Museum's garden was designed by Seattle based landscape architecture firm Gustafson, Guthrie, Nichol. Tom Hanks provided the voice-over for the first planetarium show during the opening of the new Rose Center for Earth & Space in the Hayden Planetarium in 2000. Since then such celebrities as Whoopi Goldberg, Robert Redford, Harrison Ford, Liam Neeson and Maya Angelou have been featured.

On December 31, 2001, Peter Jennings hosted ABC 2002 live from the Rose Center. The program was a more "reflective" counterpart to Dick Clark's New Year's Rockin' Eve created in the wake of the September 11 attacks.

== Design ==
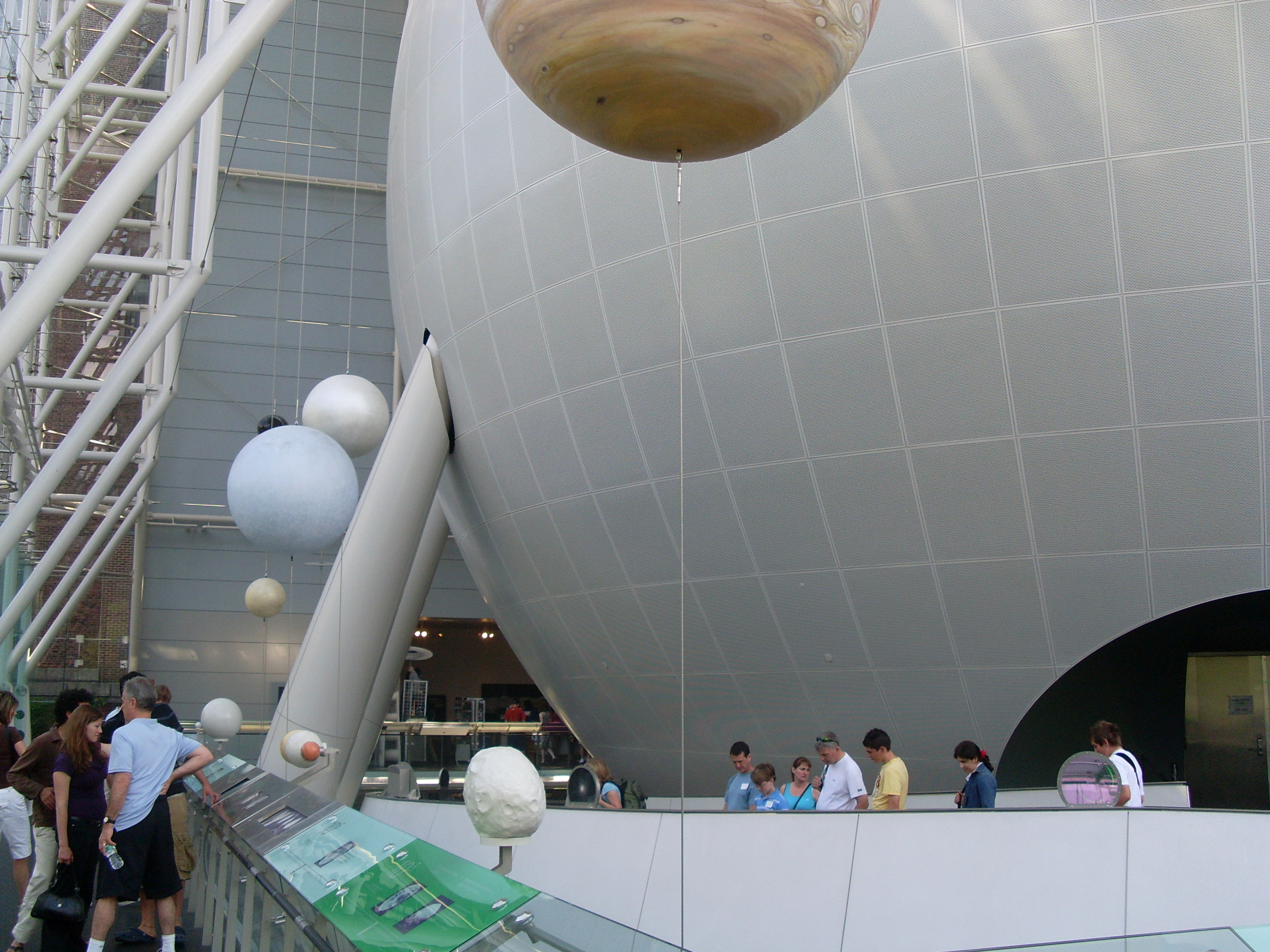
Back to front: the Hayden Sphere, the Heilbrun Cosmic Pathway, and the Scales of the Universe exhibit.

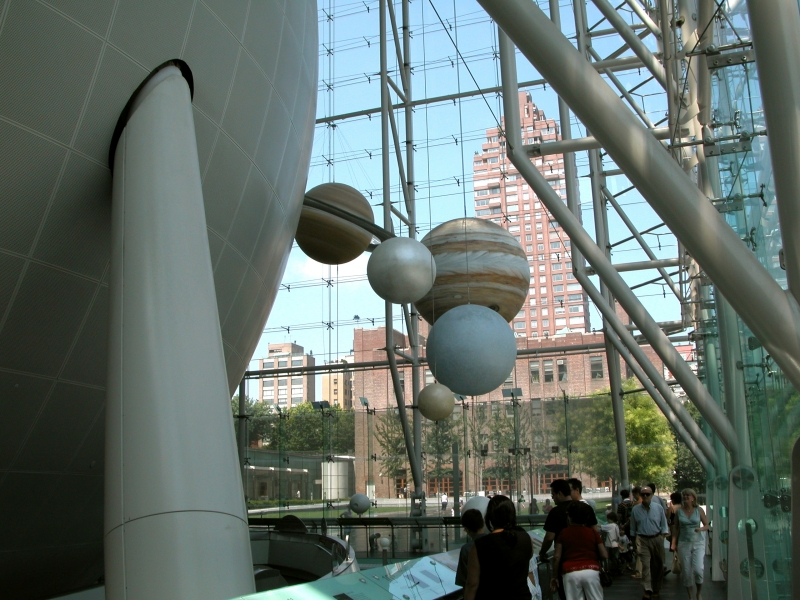
Close-up of the Scales of the Universe exhibit.

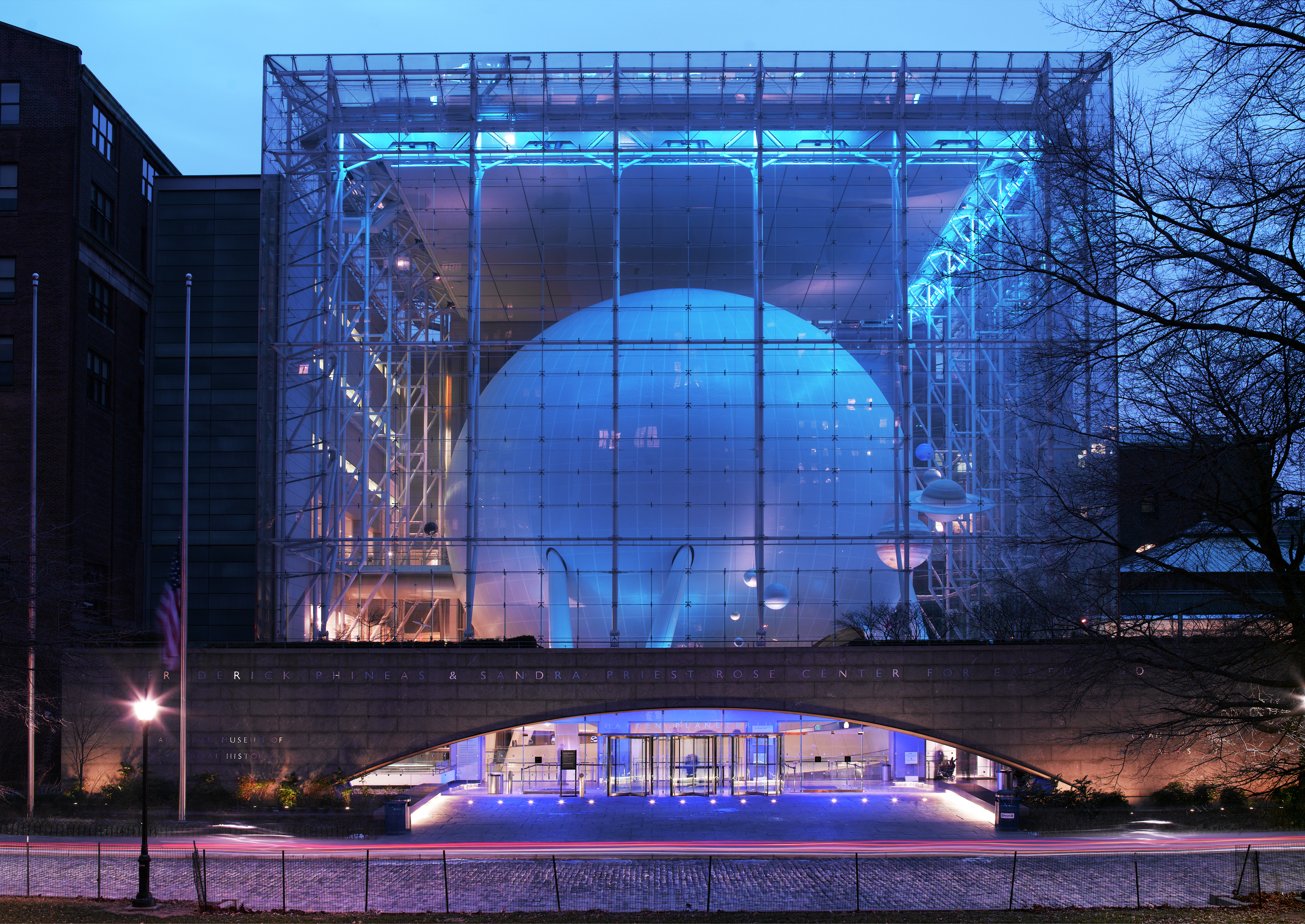
Hayden Sphere at night.

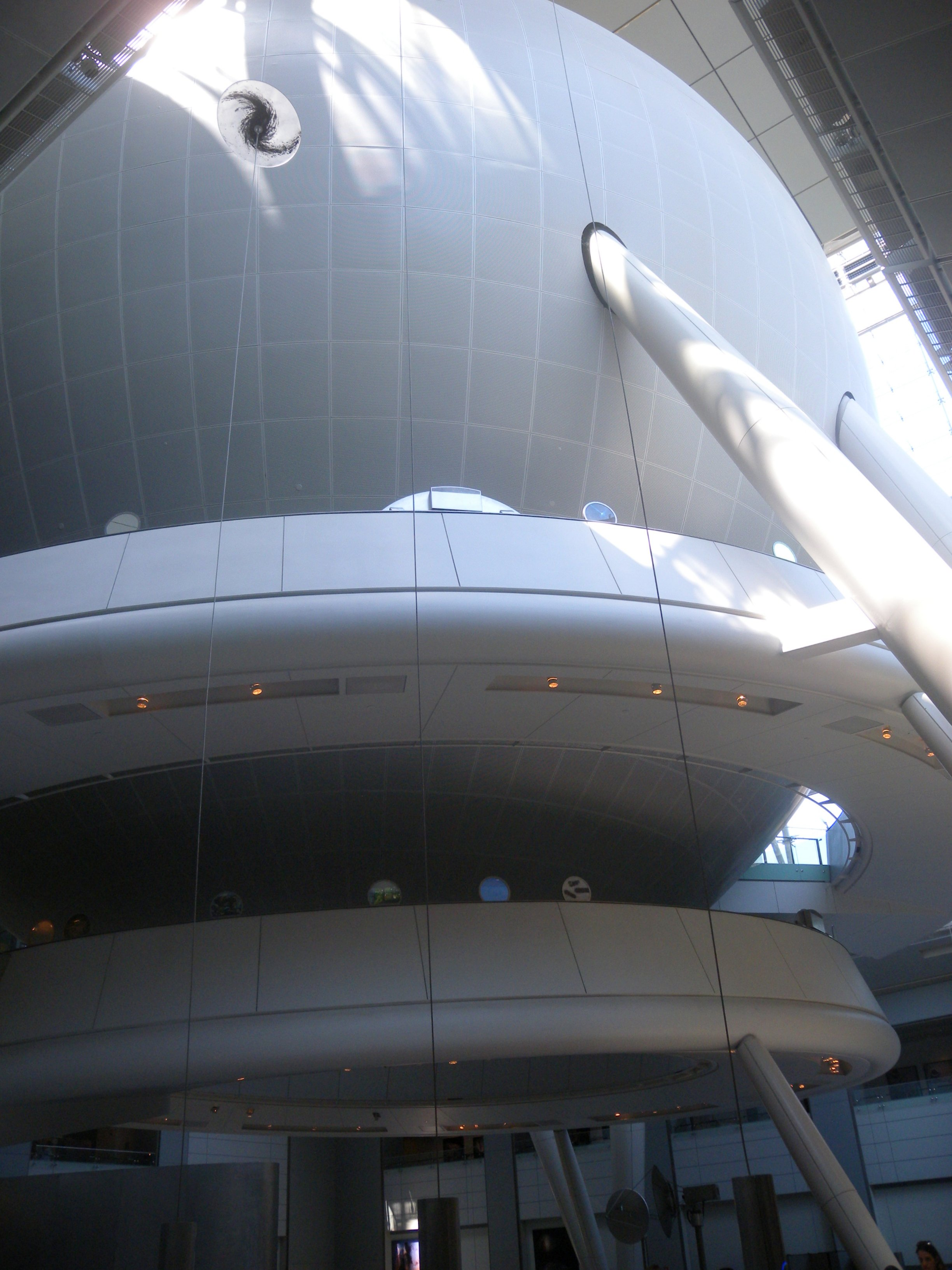
The Hayden Sphere with the winding Cosmic Pathway helix.

Designed by Polshek and Todd Schliemann, the building consists of a six-story glass cube that encloses the illuminated Hayden Sphere, 87-foot (27 m) high, which, while appearing to float, is actually supported by truss work. Polshek has referred to this work as a "cosmic cathedral".

The Rose Center and its adjacent plaza are both located at the north face of the Museum. In addition to the Hayden Planetarium it encloses 333,500 square feet (30,980 m^{2}) of floor space for research, education, and exhibition. Also located in the facility is the Department of Astrophysics, the newest academic research department in the Museum. The planetarium's original magazine, The Sky, has merged with the The Telescope to become the leading astronomy magazine Sky & Telescope.

Polshek designed the 1,800-square-foot (170 m^{2}) Weston Pavilion that presents a transparent 43-foot (13 m), "water white", glass wall standing along the Museum's west facade. The Pavilion, a companion piece to the Rose Center, provides more exhibition space for astronomically-related objects and a new public entry way to the Museum.

=== Exclusion of Pluto as a planet ===
The planetarium's exhibits highlight the human connection to the cosmos while emphasizing the scale and properties of the observable universe itself. Notably, the new Rose Center opened on February 19, 2000, with a model depicting only eight planets, excluding Pluto, as there was no scientific consensus at the time of whether Pluto is a planet, or not; where much of the American public—and some with much affection, i.e., schoolchildren and their teachers and parents—thought of Pluto as the ninth planet. Almost a year later, January 22, 2001, The New York Times reported the news of the Center's action on its front page, which led directly to much media attention and public controversy.

=== Hayden Planetarium and Big Bang Theater ===
The new Hayden Planetarium (often called "The Hayden Sphere" or "The Great Sphere") and the original Big Bang Theater are the two main attractions within the Rose Center. The original Hayden Planetarium of 1933 was established by the State of New York with start-up funding from philanthropist Charles Hayden. The top half of the Hayden Sphere houses the Star Theater, which uses a high-resolution fulldome video projector to present "space shows" based on scientific visualization of current astrophysical data; and a customized Zeiss Star Projector system that accurately replicates a typical night sky as seen from Earth. The Hayden Planetarium offers a number of public presentations and prerecorded shows.

The Big Bang Theater occupies the bottom half of the Hayden Sphere. It typically opens a public program by presenting a video that depicts the birth of the universe, with narration by Liam Neeson and utilizing a 36 feet (11 m) diameter screen standing over an 8-foot-deep (2.4 m) bowl. The Big Bang Theater also serves to introduce visitors to the Heilbrun Cosmic Pathway, a spiral walkway that wraps around the sphere, connecting the first and second floors of the Rose Center. It provides a timeline history of the universe from the Big Bang to the present day. The Heilbrun Cosmic Pathway is one of the most popular exhibits in the Rose Center.

=== Arthur Ross Terrace ===
The Arthur Ross Terrace is built over the new parking garage on 81st Street and is adjacent to the Rose Center. This rooftop plaza is designed to serve both as an outdoor gathering place for museum visitors and as a stage set that celebrates both astronomy and Earth's natural history. Renowned landscape architect Kathryn Gustafson formulated the concept for the Terrace after seeing an illustration of shadows cast by a lunar eclipse. A terrace covering 47,000 square feet (4,400 m^{2}) was then designed by landscape architects Charles Morris Anderson and Gustafson; the latter received the American Society of Landscape Architects (ASLA) Design Merit Award in 2003.

== Exhibits and shows ==
As of 2026, seven shows have premiered in the theater. The first show, Passport to the Universe, opened with the new theater and features the voice of Tom Hanks as a guide along a voyage from Earth to the edge of the observable universe. The Search for Life: Are We Alone? debuted in 2002, with narration by Harrison Ford describing the possibilities of extraterrestrial life. Opened in 2006 and narrated by Robert Redford, Cosmic Collisions examines the role that impacts have played in shaping the universe—including visualizations of Earth's magnetosphere, the formation of the Moon, and the meteorite impact that contributed to the end of the age of dinosaurs. Journey to the Stars, narrated by Whoopi Goldberg, premiered on July 4, 2009, featuring extraordinary images from telescopes on the ground and in space and stunning, never-before-seen visualizations of physics-based simulations. Dark Universe, narrated by Neil deGrasse Tyson, premiered on November 2, 2013. Worlds Beyond Earth, narrated by Lupita Nyong'o, premiered on March 24, 2021. It tells the story of the dynamic worlds of the Solar System and the unique conditions that make life on Earth possible. Encounters in the Milky Way, narrated by Pedro Pascal, premiered on June 9, 2025. It explores the movements of celestial bodies across the Milky Way and features observations from the Gaia Space Observatory and the James Webb Space Telescope.

Other exhibits can be found outside the sphere. The Gottesman Hall of the Planet Earth has displays that illustrate the Earth's geological history and weather patterns. The Cullman Hall of the Universe focuses on topics ranging from planets to stars, life on other worlds to current cosmology. The Scales of the Universe exhibit makes comparisons between the size of the Hayden Sphere and other objects in the universe presented at appropriate relative scale. There is also a photographic exhibit about the Apollo Moon landings. The photographs are throughout the first floor level of the Rose Center.

The British playwright, Stephen Laughton, is the current writer-in-residence.

== In popular culture ==
- 1979: The planetarium appears as a backdrop for scenes in the film Manhattan. Woody Allen and Diane Keaton play characters who walk around within the planetarium after escaping from a sudden downburst of rain.
- 2001: The planetarium is briefly seen in the film K-PAX starring Kevin Spacey and Jeff Bridges.
- 2002: The planetarium is briefly seen in the film Men in Black II starring Tommy Lee Jones and Will Smith.
- 2003: The planetarium features briefly in the film Eloise at the Plaza starring Sofia Vassilieva and Julie Andrews.
- 2011: The planetarium is used as part of an investigation in the White Collar episode "Where There's a Will" (S03E02).
- 2014: The planetarium is briefly seen in the film Night at the Museum: Secret of the Tomb starring Ben Stiller and Robin Williams.

== See also ==
- List of museums and cultural institutions in New York City
- Astronomy in New York City
