= Pupin Hall =

Building at Columbia University, New York

- Pupin Physics Laboratory, Columbia University
- U.S. National Register of Historic Places
- U.S. National Historic Landmark
- New York State Register of Historic Places
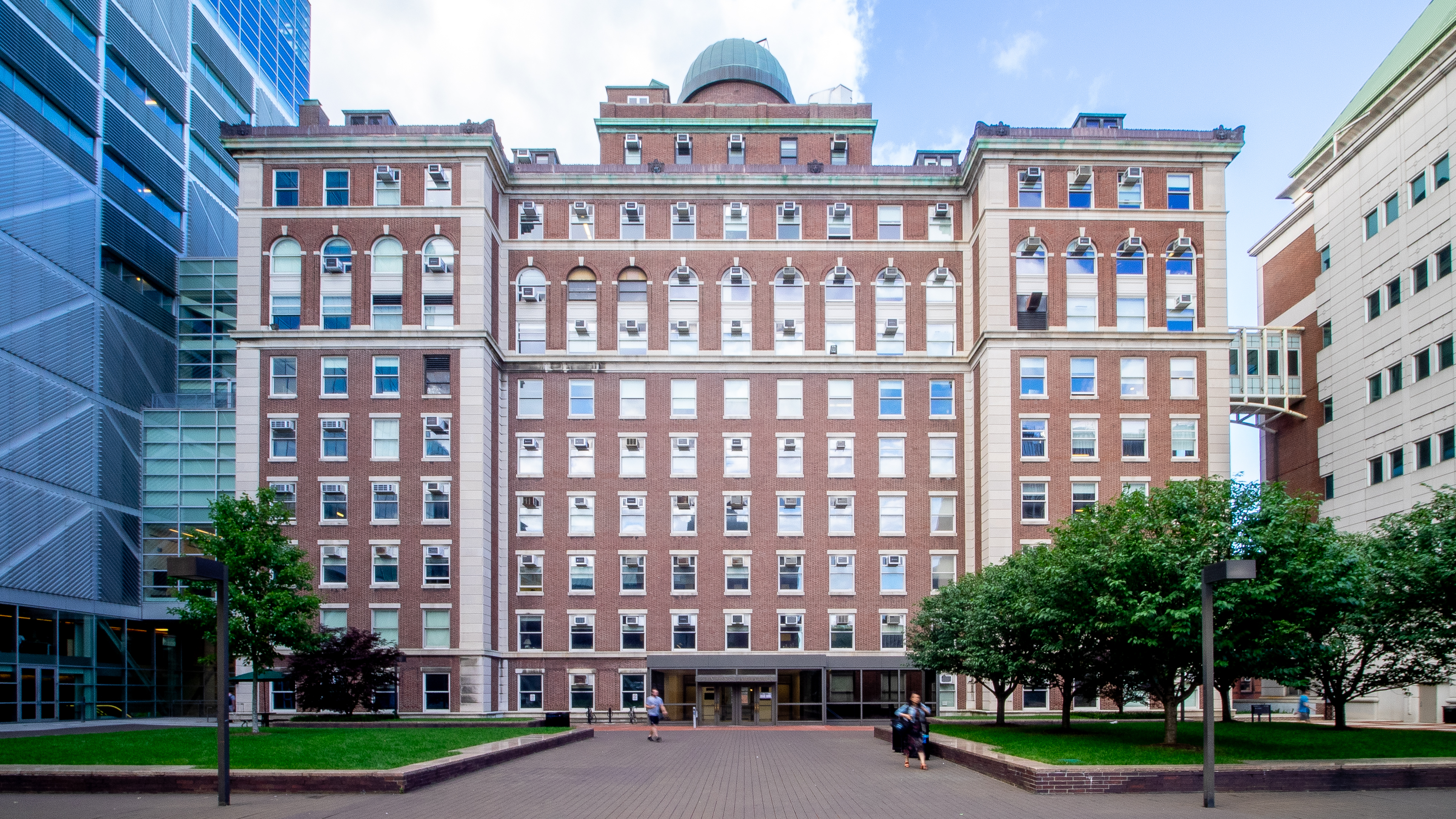
- Pupin Hall
- Location: New York, NY
- Coordinates: 40°48′36.23″N 73°57′41.52″W
- Built: 1925–1927
- Architect: McKim, Mead, and White
- Architectural style: Renaissance inspired with colonial influence
- NRHP reference No.: 66000550
- NYSRHP No.: 06101.001805

Significant dates
- Added to NRHP: October 15, 1966
- Designated NHL: December 21, 1965
- Designated NYSRHP: June 23, 1980

Pupin Physics Laboratories /ˈpjuːpɪn/, also known as Pupin Hall, is home to the physics and astronomy departments of Columbia University in New York City. The building is located on the south side of 120th Street, just east of Broadway. In 1965, Pupin was named a National Historic Landmark for its association with experiments relating to the splitting of the atom, achieved in connection with the later Manhattan Project. In 2009 the American Physical Society named Pupin Hall a historic site and honored Isidor Isaac Rabi for his work in the field of magnetic resonance.

== History ==
Pupin Hall was built in 1925–1927 to provide more space for the Physics Department which had originally been housed in Fayerweather Hall. In 1935, it was renamed after Mihajlo Idvorski Pupin (also known as Michael I. Pupin), a Serbian scientist and graduate of Columbia. Returning to the university's engineering school as a faculty member, he played a key role in establishing the department of electrical engineering. Pupin was also a brilliant inventor, developing methods for rapid x-ray photography and the "Pupin coil," a device for increasing the range of long-distance telephones. After his death in 1935, the university trustees named the newly constructed physics building the "Pupin Physics Laboratories" in his honor.

By 1931, the building which later became Pupin Hall was a leading research center. During this time Harold Urey (Nobel laureate in Chemistry) discovered deuterium and George B. Pegram was investigating the phenomena associated with the newly discovered neutron. In 1938, Enrico Fermi escaped fascist Italy after winning the Nobel prize for his work on induced radioactivity. In fact, he took his wife and children with him to Stockholm and immediately emigrated to New York. Shortly after arriving he began working at Columbia University with Dr. John Dunning. His work on nuclear fission, together with I. I. Rabi's work on atomic and molecular physics, ushered in a golden era of fundamental research at the university. One of the country's first cyclotrons was built in the basement of Pupin Hall by John R. Dunning, where it remained until 2007. The building's historic significance was secured with the first splitting of a uranium atom in the United States, which was achieved by Enrico Fermi in Pupin Hall on January 25, 1939, just 10 days after the world's first such successful experiment, carried out in Copenhagen, Denmark.

== Advances in research ==
The building is a landmark due to the advances in nuclear research made there during the Manhattan Project to develop the first nuclear weapon. It is connected to the university tunnels, from which one can occasionally access the Manhattan Project's leftover cyclotron and other historic research facilities. Many of these have been sealed off since the 1980s, when Ken Hechtman wrought havoc with nuclear materials he stole from Pupin's basement.

Other discoveries and breakthroughs achieved in Pupin, or by scientists who were faculty at Pupin at the time of discovery include:

- The discovery of deuterium by Harold Urey
- The investigation of neutron phenomena by George Pegram
- The construction of one of the country's first cyclotrons
- January 25, 1939: the first splitting of a uranium atom in the United States, by Enrico Fermi
- The 1947 measurements by Willis Lamb of the Lamb shift, and by Polykarp Kusch of the electron's anomalous magnetic dipole moment, both of which were instrumental in the development of Quantum Electrodynamics and Quantum Field Theory.
- The discovery of parity violation mediated via the weak force by Chien-Shiung Wu in the famous Wu experiment, and theoretical description by Tsung-Dao Lee and Yang Chen-Ning
- The theoretical conception of the laser by Charles H. Townes and Arthur Leonard Schawlow.

== Features ==
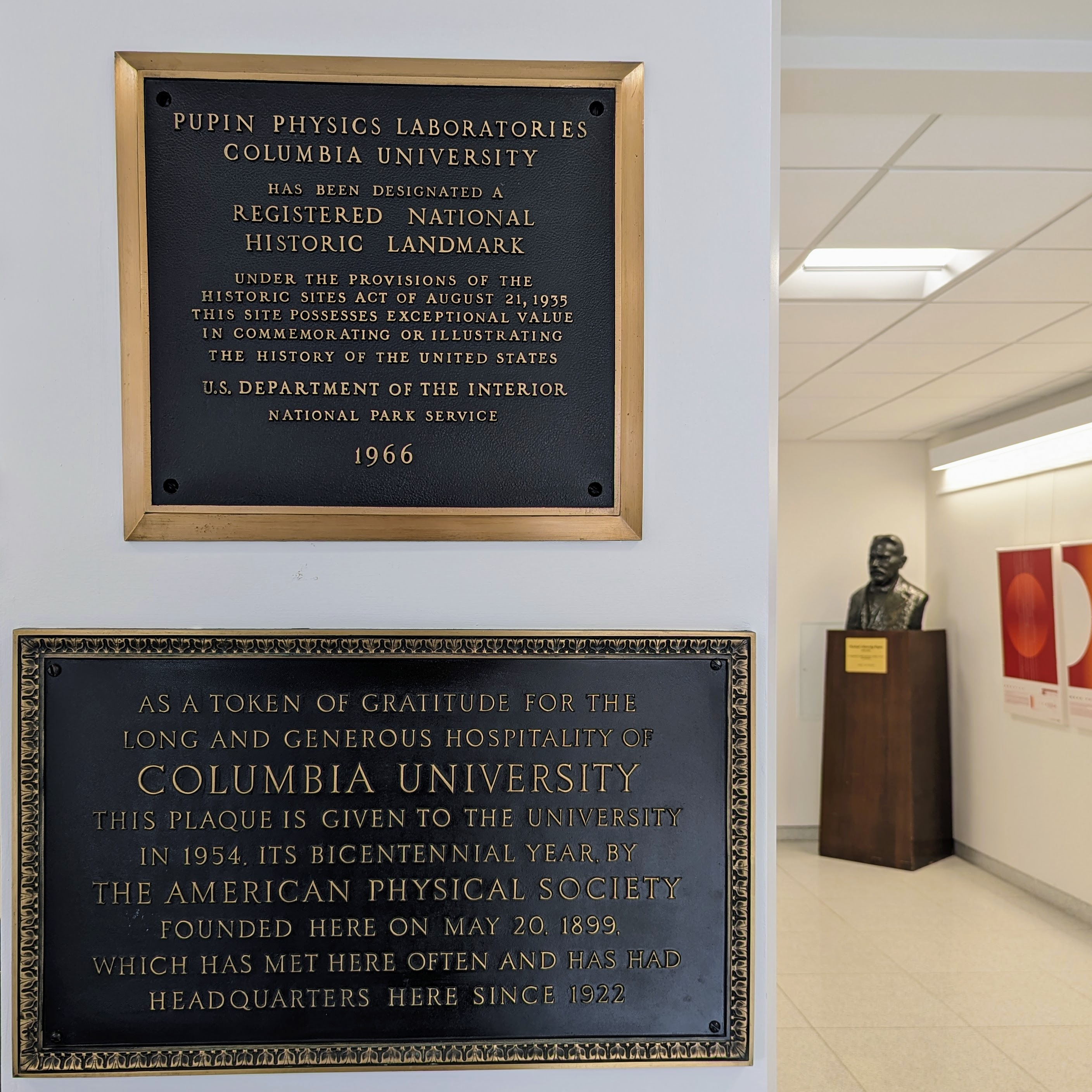
Pupin Hall Entrance

The current main entrance to Pupin is on the 5th floor from the plaza above Dodge Physical Fitness Center. This means that many of the seminar rooms in Pupin on floors 2-4, while above ground, are below campus level and, therefore, windowless. The original entryway was on the first floor from the Grove, but got blocked by the construction of Dodge in the 1960s. Uris Pool has an exit stairway leading into Pupin's entry.

The Rutherfurd Observatory is on top of Pupin. The Astronomy Department hosts bi-monthly Public Observing Nights, and serves the Tri-State area in hosting people interested in observing with an optical telescope.

The Center for Theoretical Physics, which opened in 2016, is on the ninth floor of Pupin and offers a modern office space covered in blackboards. As Brian Greene put it, "the center space is designed to encourage interactions among faculty and students.”

The bust of Mihajlo Pupin is displayed near the main entrance. It is the artwork of Ivan Meštrović from the early 20th century, made as a personal gift from the sculptor to Pupin.

== Notable faculty and students ==
- I. I. Rabi
- Enrico Fermi
- R. A. Millikan
- Chien-Shiung Wu
- Julian Schwinger
- Polykarp Kusch
- Willis Lamb
- Tsung-Dao Lee
- Charles H. Townes
- Arthur Leonard Schawlow
- Horst Ludwig Störmer
- Tony Heinz
- Malvin Ruderman
- Norman Christ
- Alfred Mueller
- Allan Blaer
- Boris Altshuler
- Elena Aprile
- Rachel Rosen
- Brian Greene

== See also ==
- Columbia University Physics Department
- List of National Historic Landmarks in New York City
- National Register of Historic Places listings in Manhattan above 110th Street
