= David Helfand =

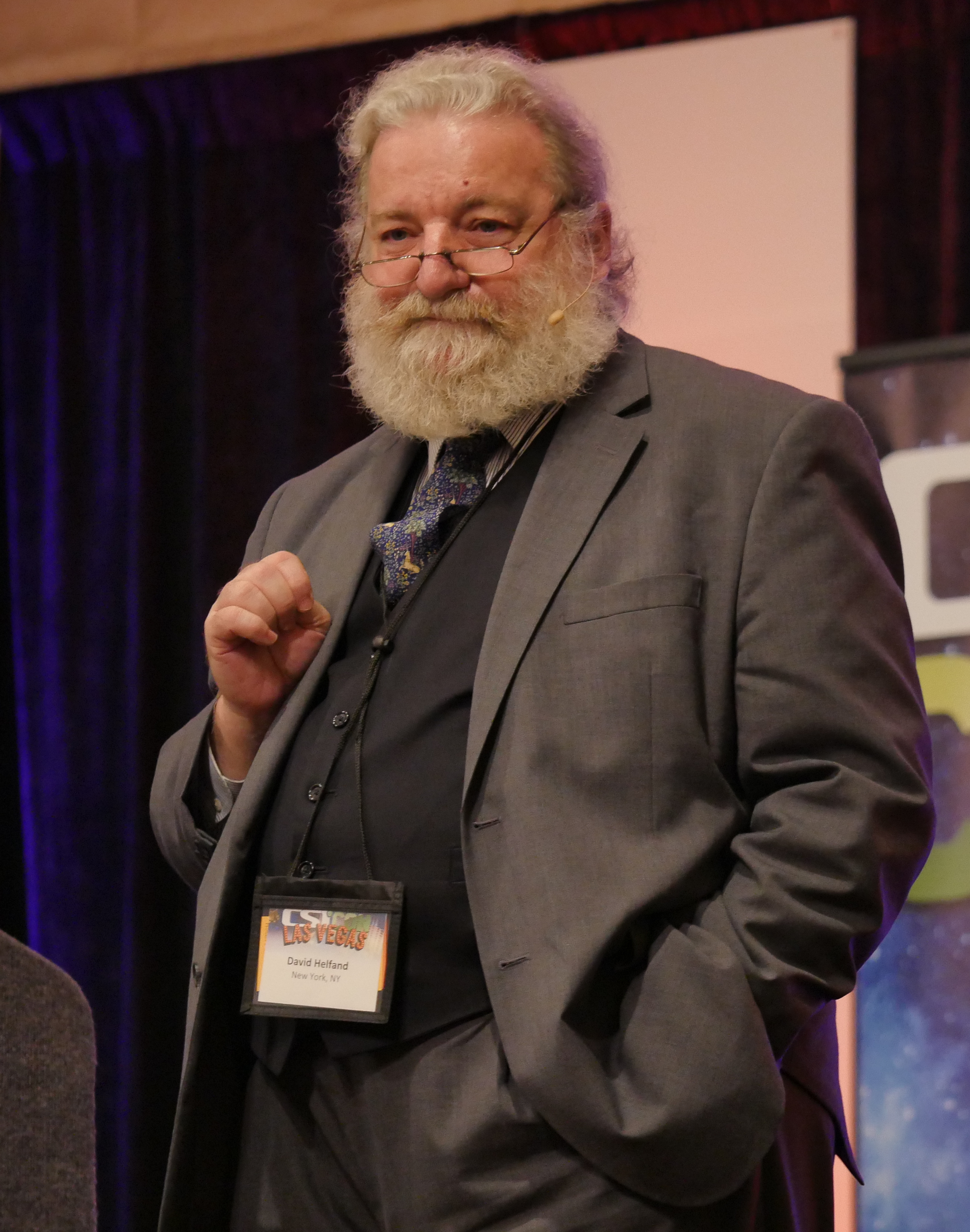
- CSICon 2016
- Education: Amherst College; University of Massachusetts
- Known for: Views on tenure Quest University
- Scientific career
- Fields: Astrophysics
- Workplaces: Columbia University; Quest University
- Doctoral advisor: Joseph Taylor
- Doctoral students: Elizabeth Blanton

David J. Helfand is a U.S. astronomer who served as president of Quest University Canada from 2008 to 2015. He has also served as chair of the Department of Astronomy at Columbia University and co-director of the Columbia Astrophysics Laboratory.

== Education ==
Helfand earned a Bachelor of Arts from Amherst College in 1973 and an MS and PhD from the University of Massachusetts Amherst both in 1977.

== Career ==
=== Columbia University ===
David Helfand has been affiliated with Columbia University since 1977. Immediately after obtaining his PhD from the University of Massachusetts, he joined Columbia as a research associate for two years before obtaining a tenure track position.

He has, at times, been part of both the department of Astronomy and the Department of Physics. As part of the department of Astronomy he served as chair from 1986 until 1992, and again from 2002 until the present. During his time at Columbia he has mentored 22 PhD students, although he tends to focus more on undergraduate education.

His stated research interests include radio surveys, the origin and evolution of neutron stars and supernova remnants, and active galactic nuclei. Helfand has been instrumental in the creation of general education classes oriented around the sciences, developing a course, Frontiers of Science,

He was elected a Legacy Fellow of the American Astronomical Society in 2020.

==== Tenure ====
Helfand notably declined an offer of tenure from Columbia in the early 1980s due to his belief that the tenure system does more to deny academic freedom to those who do not have tenure than it does to protect the freedom of those who do have tenure. He believes that it also selects the wrong fraction of smart people in society to play the important role of advancing knowledge and passing it on to the next generation. He advocates a system in which each senior professor's job performance is reviewed every six years by a five-member ad hoc faculty committee, which would then recommend whether the professor should be retained or dismissed. In such a system, each professor would serve on one such ad hoc committee per year, except for the year in which he or she is being reviewed. Although his proposed system is unorthodox, Columbia agreed to implement it in Helfand's case.

==== Frontiers of Science ====
Along with Darcy Kelley, a professor of biological sciences, he pushed for and succeeded in creating a new science core curriculum class called Frontiers of Science, which is claimed to "make (students) aware that they can think about problems the way scientists think about problems". Rather than being taught by a single professor on a single topic, "four scientists in different disciplines deliver a series of three lectures each describing the background, context, and current state of an area of research". After being piloted in Fall 2003, it subsequently become part of the Core Curriculum of Columbia College, the university's undergraduate liberal arts and sciences division.

=== Quest University Canada ===
Helfand joined Quest University Canada in British Columbia, Canada, as a Visiting Tutor in 2007. In July 2011, Helfand took a leave of absence from Columbia and assumed the presidency of Quest University. This private university embodied many of his views, having "no faculty ranks, no tenure and no departments." Helfand claimed that this approach by Quest University "fosters academic freedom, minimizes bureaucracy, and places the university's focus on teaching and scholarship." This unusual educational approach at Quest attracted media attention. While there, he started a course called "Global Warming: What We Know and What We Don't Know" focusing on a "dispassionate" approach to the subject. Helfand was motivated to develop the course because of what he believed to be "a large amount of misinformation" in the climate change debate.

== Skepticism ==
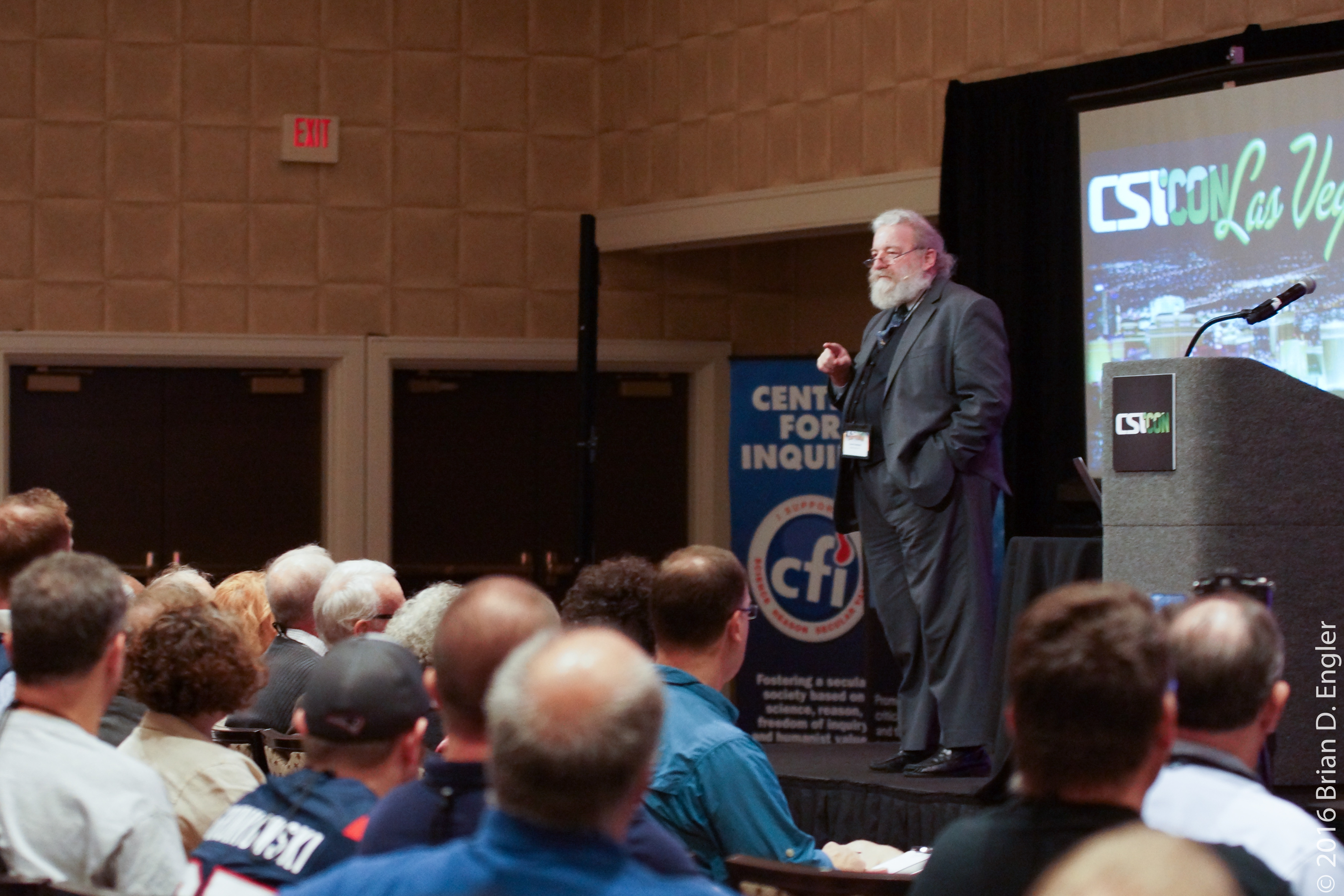
"Surviving the Misinformation Age" at CSICon 2016

David Helfand is a fellow for the Committee for Skeptical Inquiry and, in addition to starting the course on global warming at Quest University, he has often expressed views in line with the skeptical movement. In 2006, he signed a document written by the Washington DC office of the Center for Inquiry called the "Declaration in Defense of Science and Secularism". This document expressed worry about the "disdain for science" expressed by many Americans, and "the persistence of paranormal and occult beliefs". Furthermore, in 2011 he wrote an opinion piece in The New York Times criticizing ESP research by Daryl Bem, stating that "I have little doubt that Professor Bem's experiments will fail (to be replicated)".
