= Department of Physics (Columbia University) =

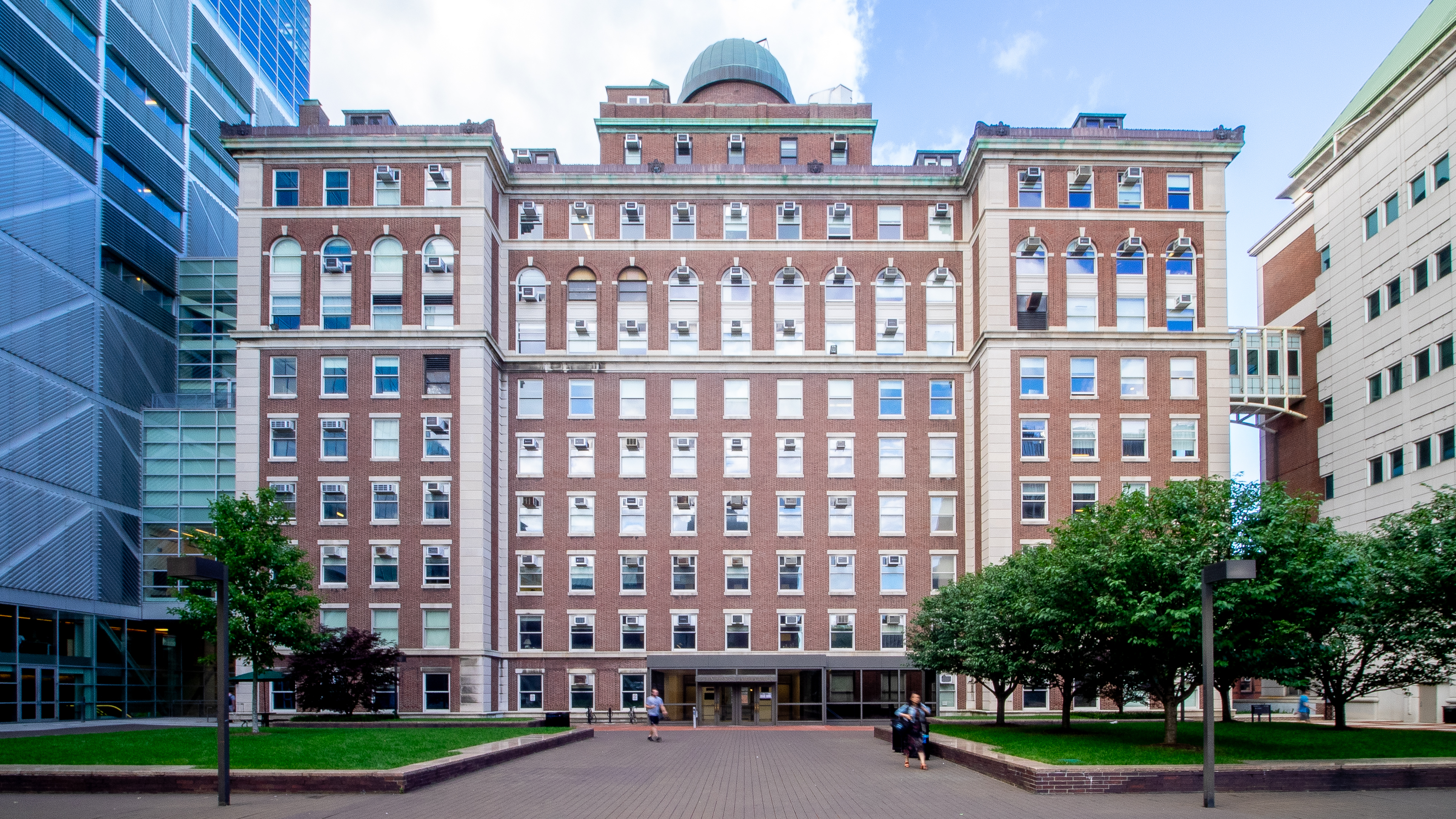
Pupin Hall, home of the Physics Department

The Department of Physics is an academic department at Columbia University in New York City, New York, United States.

The department, in combination with the Applied Physics and Medical Physics faculty in the Department of Applied Physics and Applied Mathematics, includes approximately 80 faculty members teaching and conducting research in the areas of astrophysics, high energy nuclear physics, high energy particle physics, plasma physics, atomic-molecular-optical physics, condensed matter physics, biophysics, radiology, and theoretical physics.

This research is conducted in Pupin Hall, The Northwest Corner Building, and the Shapiro Center for Engineering and Physical Sciences Research (CEPSR), all on the university's Morningside Heights campus; Nevis Laboratories upstate in Irvington, New York; and at a number of other affiliated institutions. The department is connected with and has faculty working as research scientists at Brookhaven National Laboratories and CERN.

Columbia graduates approximately 55 undergraduate physics majors each year in the College and School of Engineering and Applied Science (including Applied Physics, Astrophysics, Biophysics, and Chemical Physics) and is home to about 100 graduate students.

== History ==
The decommissioned cyclotron originally used by Enrico Fermi.

The roots of graduate physics can be traced back to the opening of the School of Mines in 1864 although the department was only formally established in 1892. In 1899 the American Physical Society was founded at a meeting at Columbia. Several years later, the Earnest Kempton Adams Fund enabled the department to invite distinguished scientists to the school. Among the distinguished EKA lecturers were Hendrik Lorentz (1905-1906) and Max Planck (1909). During Lorentz's stay at Columbia he wrote one of his most important works, the Theory of Electrons.

By 1931, Pupin Labs was a leading research center. During this time Harold Urey (Nobel laureate in Chemistry) discovered deuterium and George B. Pegram was investigating the phenomena associated with the newly discovered neutron. In 1938, Enrico Fermi escaped fascist Italy after winning the Nobel prize for his work on induced radioactivity. In fact, he took his wife and children with him to Stockholm and immediately emigrated to New York. Shortly after arriving he began working at Columbia. His work on nuclear fission, together with Rabi's work on atomic and molecular physics, ushered in a golden era of fundamental research at the university. One of the country's first cyclotrons was built in the basement of Pupin Hall, where parts of it still remain.

Before and after the Second World War, research was conducted into the magnetic moments of nuclei and electrons. Together with Willis Lamb's work on the understanding of the fine structure of hydrogen, these experiments were crucial to the later development of quantum electrodynamics, for which Feynman and Schwinger won the Nobel prize. During this same time Chien-Shiung Wu was conducting landmark research at Nevis on weak interactions, which led to the theoretical prediction and subsequent observation of maximal parity nonconservation.

During the war, many microwave techniques were learned that were later used at Columbia for the development of the maser, the microwave precursor to the laser, at to the observation of large nuclear quadrupole moments, which led to the introduction of the unified nuclear model by James Rainwater. In the 1940s theoretical research was focussed on calculations in quantum electrodynamics. In the 1950s, there was a shift towards high-energy physics. During this time Tsung-Dao Lee and his collaborators' work led to the discovery of parity and charge conjugation symmetries in the weak interaction. During these years, a new, more powerful cyclotron was also built at Nevis.

The entrance to Pupin Labs at Columbia

As physicists investigated matter at ever finer scales, higher energy experiments were required. Many of these were done at Nevis and at Brookhaven. Rainwater and Fitch explored the structure of nuclei by observing x-ray transitions in muonic atoms. Richard Garwin and Leon Lederman observed parity nonconservation in pion and muon decay. Lederman, Schwartz, and Steinberger proved that the muon neutrino was distinct from the electron neutrino.

Today, Columbia experimenters conduct work at labs across the world. These include CERN, in Geneva, Switzerland, Brookhaven National Laboratory, in Upton, New York, and Fermi National Accelerator Laboratory, in Batavia, Illinois. Pupin Labs also houses a 400-Gigaflops dedicated supercomputer built by Norman Christ, which is used for calculations in lattice quantum chromodynamics.

== Nobel laureates ==
Scientists who have received the Nobel Prize for work done while on faculty at Columbia University:

- Isidor Isaac Rabi
- Polykarp Kusch
- Willis Lamb
- Charles Townes
- Aage Bohr
- Tsung-Dao Lee
- James Rainwater
- Leon Lederman
- Melvin Schwartz
- Jack Steinberger

Other faculty:

- Enrico Fermi
- Hideki Yukawa
- Willis Lamb
- Maria Goeppert-Mayer
- Samuel Chao Chung Ting
- Steven Weinberg
- Horst Störmer

Scientists who received the Nobel Prize and have doctorates from Columbia University:

- Isidor Isaac Rabi
- James Rainwater
- Leon Lederman
- Melvin Schwartz
- Robert Millikan
- Julian Schwinger
- Leon Cooper
- Val Fitch
- Arno Penzias
- Norman Ramsey
- Martin Lewis Perl

Visiting professors:

- Murray Gell-Mann
- Hans Bethe
- Daniel Tsui

Research staff:

- Maria Goeppert-Mayer
- Aage Bohr
- Arthur Leonard Schawlow
- Carlo Rubbia

EKA Lecturers:

- Hendrik Lorentz
- Wilhelm Wien
- Max Planck

== See also ==
- Columbia University
- Fu Foundation School of Engineering and Applied Science
- List of computational physics software
- Michael Idvorsky Pupin
- Nevis Laboratories
