= Ken Hechtman =

Canadian journalist (born 1967)

Ken Hechtman (born December 16, 1967) is a freelance journalist and convicted drug dealer from Canada who achieved brief international prominence in late 2001 when Afghanistan's Taliban government charged him with being a United States spy while he researched a story for the Montreal Mirror. Afghanistan tried, acquitted, and released him after a short time in jail.

== Early life and education ==
Hechtman was born in Montreal, Canada.

In fall 1986, he began studying at Columbia University where, in his free time, he explored the Columbia University tunnels. That same academic year, in February 1987, campus security found chemicals including uranium-238 and chloroform in Hechtman's McBain Hall dormitory. He was suspended from the university for a year and was required to reapply for admission. Instead, he planned to attend Vanier College.

In 1989, it was reported that he spent 9 days in jail for assaulting a police officer while protesting the 1988 Democratic National Convention in Atlanta, Georgia.

== Capture by the Taliban ==
On November 25, 2001, he was captured by the Taliban hours after crossing into Afghanistan, while working as a reporter for the Montreal Mirror. He was held in the town of Spin Boldak and was released approximately one week later. At that time, he identified as Jewish.

== Criminal charges ==
He married fellow Montrealer and journalist Wendy Hechtman on September 12, 2015. They moved to Nebraska in February 2016.

In 2017, Hechtman and his wife Wendy were charged with conspiracy to manufacture 10 grams or more of fentanyl analogue, conspiracy to distribute a fentanyl analogue, and possession with intent to distribute 400 grams or more of a fentanyl analogue between on or about March 2017 and October 30, 2017. According to police investigators, the pair invented a pastel-colored version of carfentanil, an opioid that can be up to 10,000 times more powerful than morphine and that can kill a human with only a few grains touching human skin. Hechtman allegedly "developed a sophisticated marketing system with a sales team of about 40 people."

They pleaded guilty, and were both sentenced to 15 years in federal prison in 2018. Hechtman was released on probation in November 2023.

== Bibliography ==
- Lisa Birnbach's New and Improved College Book, by Lisa Birnbach (1992) ISBN 0-671-79289-X
