= Allan Blaer =

American physicist

Allan Blaer (born 1942) is a physicist, professor emeritus and special lecturer at Columbia University in New York City.

== Biography ==
Blaer grew up in Scarsdale, New York and received his undergraduate degree from Columbia University in 1964, where he was the valedictorian. He later went on to obtain his PhD in physics at Columbia in 1970. He has done research in both theoretical and experimental physics. In quantum field theory, he worked on phase transitions in low-temperature bosonic and fermionic systems, quantum field theory anomalies, dyons and magnetic monopoles in non-abelian gauge theories, and renormalization theory. In experimental physics, he has worked on precision measurement of vacuum polarization in muonic atoms to test quantum electrodynamics.

Blaer was the director of undergraduate studies until 2008. Alongside a group of physics majors, Blaer established the Columbia University Chapter of the Society of Physics Students in November 1980. Until 2016, he ran the highly selective Columbia University Science Honors Program.

Blaer has also earned a reputation for being an excellent teacher of physics, particularly for his graduate classical electrodynamics course at Columbia, for which he has taught for decades.

== Publications ==
- Blaer, A. S.; Ren, H. C.; Tchernyshyov, O. (1997-03-01). "Extended bound states and resonances of two fermions on a periodic lattice". Physical Review B. 55 (9): 6035–6043. arXiv:supr-con/9608003. Bibcode:1997PhRvB..55.6035B. doi:10.1103/physrevb.55.6035. ISSN 0163-1829. S2CID 119037409.
- Blaer, Allan; Han, Jining (1992-09-01). "Monte Carlo simulation of lattice bosons in three dimensions". Physical Review A. 46 (6). American Physical Society (APS): 3225–3233. Bibcode:1992PhRvA..46.3225B. doi:10.1103/physreva.46.3225. ISSN 1050-2947. PMID 9908490.
- Blaer, A.; French, J.; Sachs, A. M.; May, M.; Zavattini, E. (1989-07-01). "Measurement of K x rays from muonic helium formed in a low-density target in an intense pulsed muon beam". Physical Review A. 40 (1). American Physical Society (APS): 158–162. Bibcode:1989PhRvA..40..158B. doi:10.1103/physreva.40.158. ISSN 0556-2791. PMID 9901879.
- "Study of the Polarization Dependence of the Photoelectric Effect in the Soft X-Ray Band: A Focal Plane Photoelectric Stellar X-Ray Polarimeter for the SPECTRUM-X-Gamma Mission" (with A. Heckler, P. Kaaret and R. Novick) SPIE X-Ray/EUV Optics for Astronomy and Microscopy 1160, 580 (1989)
- Blaer, Allan S.; Christ, Norman H.; Tang, Ju-Fei (1981-11-09). "Anomalous Fermion Production by a Julia-Zee Dyon". Physical Review Letters. 47 (19). American Physical Society (APS): 1364–1367. Bibcode:1981PhRvL..47.1364B. doi:10.1103/physrevlett.47.1364. ISSN 0031-9007.
- Blaer, Allan S.; Christ, Norman H.; Tang, Ju-Fei (1982-04-15). "Fermion emission from a Julia-Zee dyon". Physical Review D. 25 (8). American Physical Society (APS): 2128–2140. Bibcode:1982PhRvD..25.2128B. doi:10.1103/physrevd.25.2128. ISSN 0556-2821.
