= Rutherfurd Observatory =

Astronomical facility maintained by Columbia University

Coordinates: 40.8100°N 73.9614°W

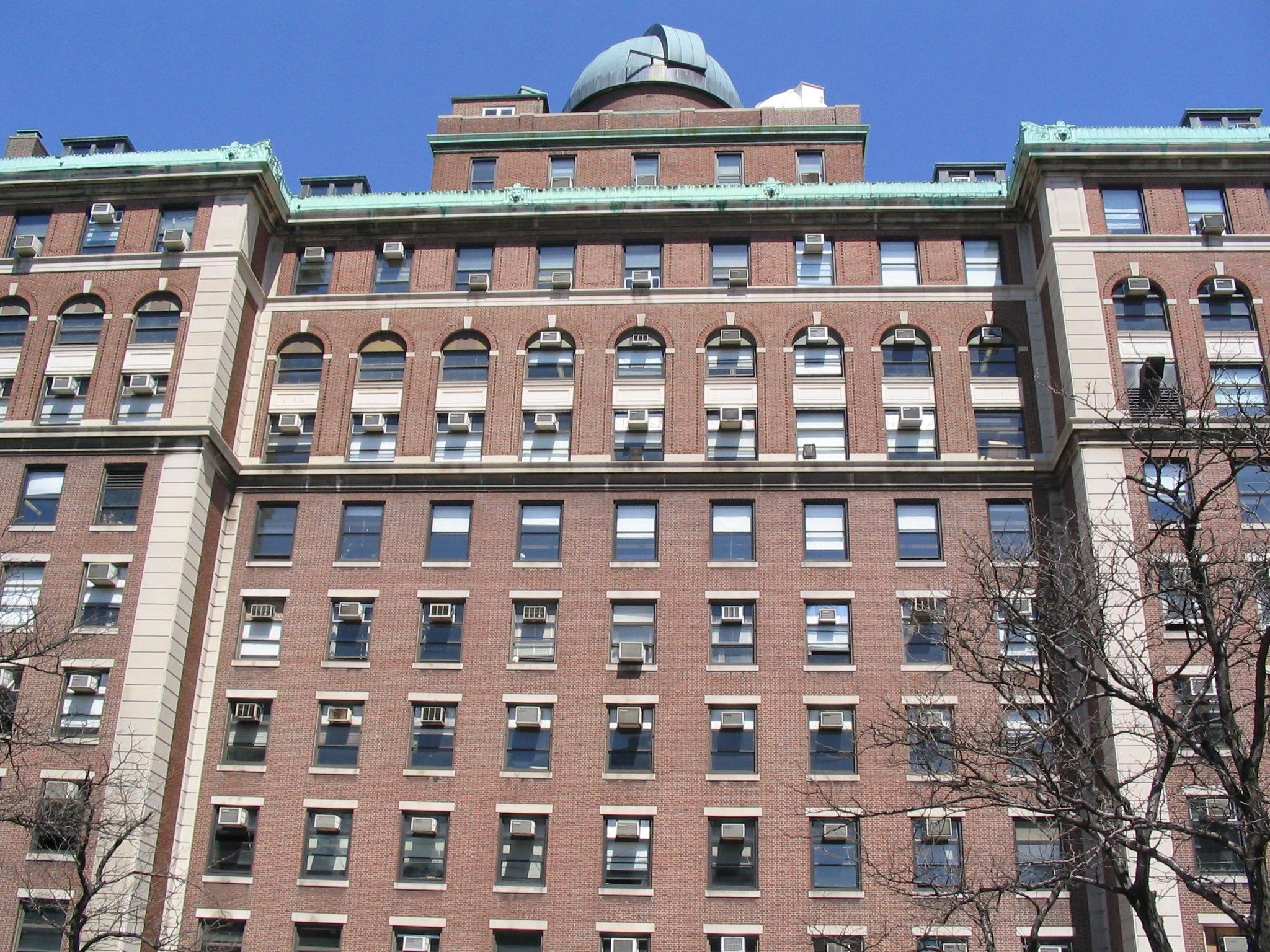
Rutherfurd Observatory atop Pupin Hall

Rutherfurd Observatory is the astronomical facility maintained by Columbia University named after Lewis Morris Rutherfurd. Initially, Rutherfurd housed its telescopes and equipment in midtown Manhattan and later on the Stuyvesant Estate. When the Morningside campus was built, telescopes were kept in a "transit building" where the Interdisciplinary Science Building now stands. When Pupin Physics Laboratories were completed in 1927, the home of the observatory was moved to the top of the building. Below the Rutherfurd Observatory on the 14th floor was the site of Professor Wallace Eckert's Astronomical Laboratory, in which he constructed the first device to perform general scientific calculations automatically in 1933-34.

The observatory formerly included a twelve-inch (30 cm.) refractor telescope built by the Alvan Clark firm in 1916. The telescope was for many years used almost entirely for student education. It was sold in 1997 to South Carolina State Museum, which specializes in the upkeep of the old Alvan Clark refractors.

In the 1970s, the "Columbia CO Survey" built a 1.2-meter radio telescope that operated out of the Little Dome and was the first to map the sky in this important radio band.

Rutherfurd observatory has been in continuous operation since Pupin was constructed, but in 2009 a new "Northwest Corner Building" was erected next to it, six floors higher than the roof of Pupin and blocking a significant portion of its field of view, and putting out a considerable amount of light, interfering with observations in the remaining sky.

== See also ==
- List of astronomical observatories
