= Steve Duncan =

American urban historian and photographer

- Education: Columbia University
- Occupations: Urban historian and photographer

Steve Duncan is a retired urban explorer formerly based in New York City, now living in Maryland. He has extensively explored the New York City sewer system and other tunnels in the New York City area such as the New York City Subway System and Amtrak tunnels that run through the city. Duncan has also explored sewers and underground infrastructure around the world. He has explored sewers and tunnels beneath Paris, London, Milan, Rome, Naples, Stockholm, Berlin, Moscow, Montreal, Toronto, Chicago and Los Angeles. He also hosted a television show on The Discovery Channel in 2005. The show aired for five episodes and has since occasionally been aired in syndication.

Duncan has been involved in attempting to map current day and historic sewers and tunnels. One of his most recent projects has been to map the development of storm drains in Los Angeles, California.

Duncan retired from urban exploring in part due to repeated health issues associated with the hobby, including two hospitalizations due to infection from pathogens he encountered in New York's sewer system. He has since relocated to Maryland, where he now works in real estate.
