= Lützen (disambiguation) =

Lützen is a town in Germany. Lützen may also refer to:

== People ==
- Elinborg Lützen (1919–1995), Faroese graphic designer
- Jesper Lützen (born 1951), Danish historian
- Johannes Lützen Bouma (born 1934), Dutch economist

== Other uses ==
- Lützen (wargame), board wargame
- Lützen-Wiesengrund, district in Germany
- Battle of Lützen (1632), one of the most important battles of the Thirty Years' War
- Battle of Lützen (1813), battle of the Napoleonic Wars
