= Lützen-Wiesengrund =

Coordinates: 51°15′N 12°08′E

Lützen-Wiesengrund was a Verwaltungsgemeinschaft ("collective municipality") in the district Burgenlandkreis, in Saxony-Anhalt, Germany. It was situated east of Weißenfels. The seat of the Verwaltungsgemeinschaft was in Lützen. It was disbanded in January 2011.

== Subdivision ==
The Verwaltungsgemeinschaft Lützen-Wiesengrund consisted of the following municipalities:

1. Dehlitz
2. Lützen
3. Sössen
4. Zorbau
