= Vacha, Germany =

Vacha
- Town
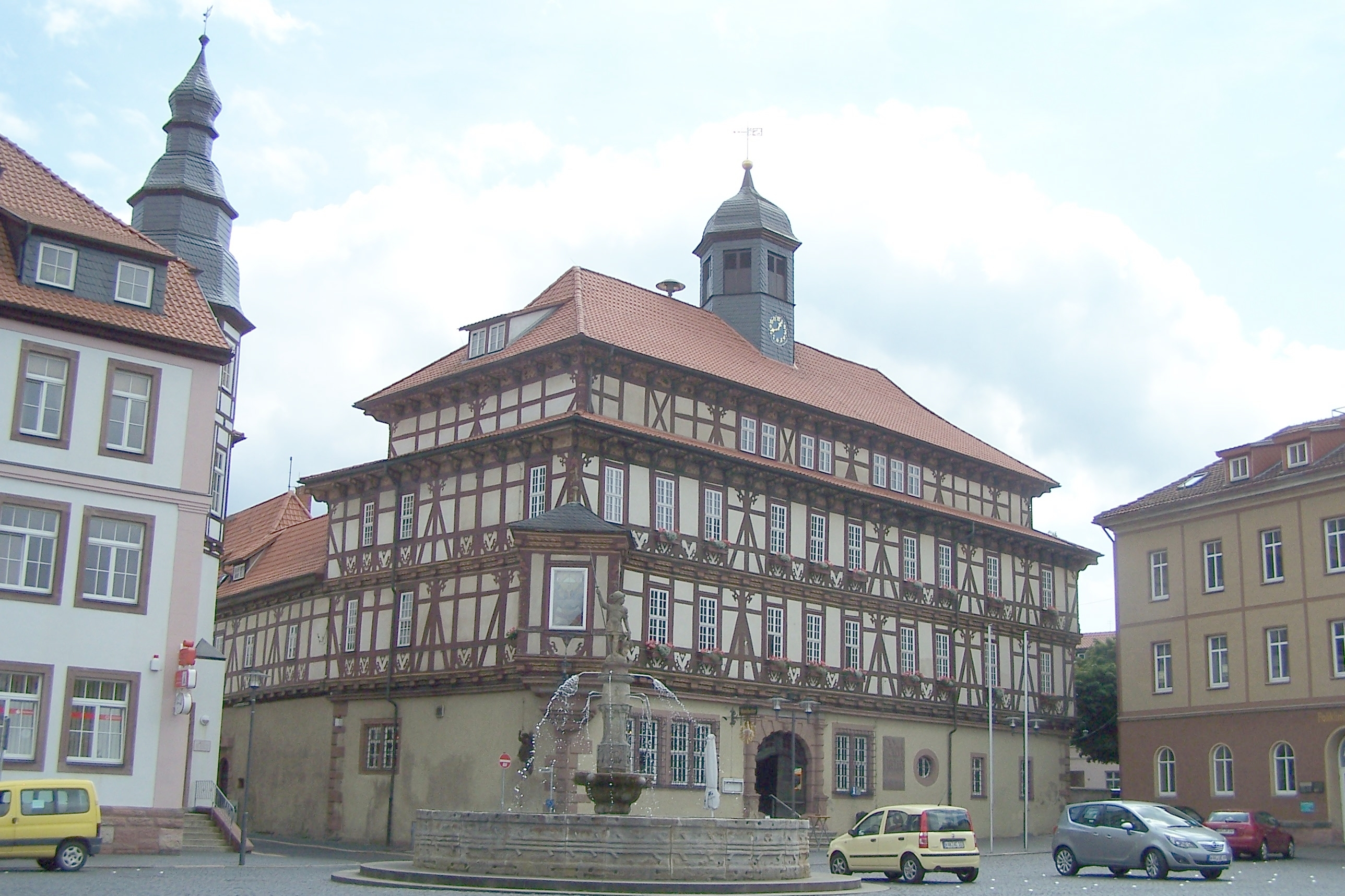
- Town hall

- Coat of arms

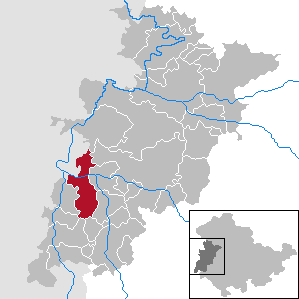
- Location of Vacha within Wartburgkreis district
- Interactive map of Vacha
- Location within Germany Location within Thuringia
- Coordinates: 50°49′44″N 10°1′17″E
- Country: Germany
- State: Thuringia
- District: Wartburgkreis
- Subdivisions: 18

Government
  - Mayor (2024–30): Martin Müller (CDU)

Area
  - Total: 44.41 km^{2} (17.15 sq mi)
- Elevation: 223 m (732 ft)

Population (2025-12-31)
  - Total: 4,891
  - Density: 110.1/km^{2} (285.2/sq mi)
- Time zone: UTC+01:00 (CET)
  - Summer (DST): UTC+02:00 (CEST)
- Postal codes: 36404
- Dialling codes: 036962
- Vehicle registration: WAK
- Website: www.vacha.de

Vacha (German pronunciation: [ˈfaxa]) is a town in the Wartburgkreis district, in Thuringia, Germany. It is situated on the river Werra, 15 km west of Bad Salzungen, and 23 km east of Bad Hersfeld.

== History ==
Within the German Empire (1871–1918), Vacha was part of the Grand Duchy of Saxe-Weimar-Eisenach.

=== Sons and daughters of the city ===
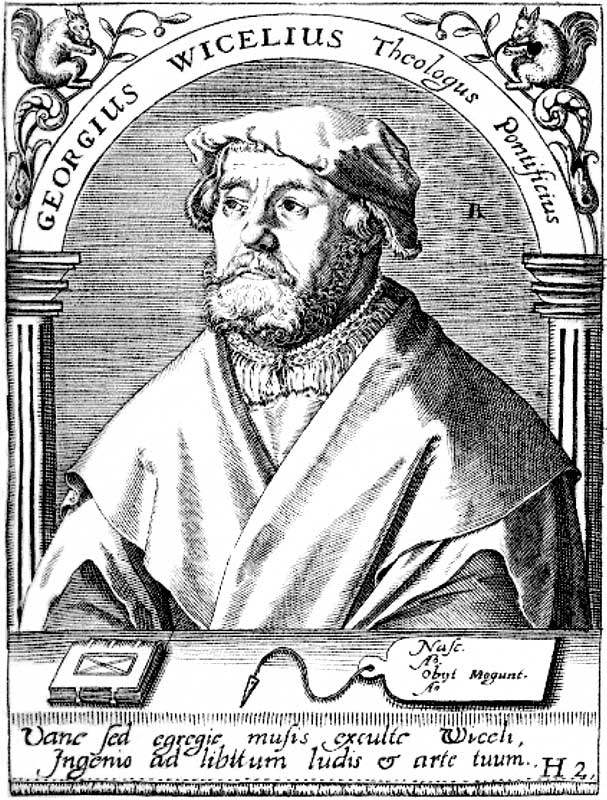
Georg Witzel

- Georg Witzel (1501–1573), theologian and opponent of Luther
- Johann Gottfried Seume (1763–1810), born in Poserna, a German author, poet, writer, traveler, shanghaied in Vacha in 1781 by Hessian recruiters on his way to Paris, forced to serve in the army as a Hessian soldier, and leased to England by the Landgrave of Hesse-Cassel to fight in the American War of Independence. The local municipal gymnasium is named for him.
