= Horizon =

Apparent curve that separates earth from sky

True, visible, and astronomical horizons. Not shown: refracted horizon.

Most commonly, the horizon is the border between the surface of a celestial body and its sky when viewed from the perspective of an observer on or above the surface of the celestial body. This concept is further refined as:

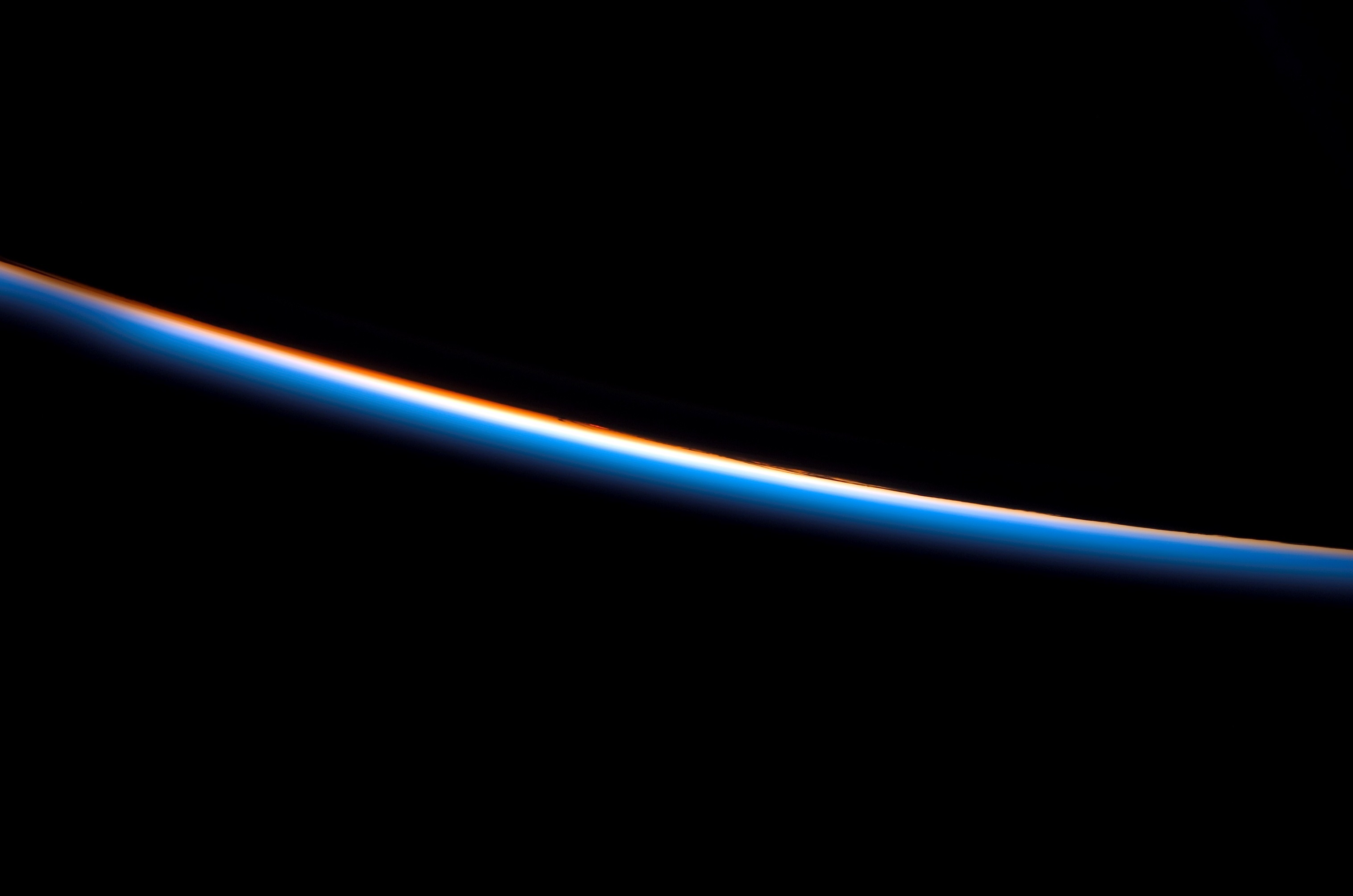
The curvature of Earth's horizon as observed from a Space Shuttle at an altitude of 226 km (140 mi).

- The true or geometric horizon, which an observer would see if there was no alteration from refraction or from obstruction by intervening objects. The geometric horizon assumes a spherical earth. The true horizon takes into account the fact that the earth is an irregular ellipsoid. When refraction is minimal, the visible sea or ocean horizon is the closest an observer can get to seeing the true horizon.
- The refracted or apparent horizon, which is the true horizon viewed through atmospheric refraction. Refraction can make distant objects seem higher or, less often, lower than they actually are. An unusually large refraction may cause a distant object to appear ("loom") above the refracted horizon or disappear ("sink") below it.
- The visible horizon, which is the refracted horizon obscured by terrain and, on Earth, by life forms such as trees and/or human constructs such as buildings.

There is also an imaginary astronomical, celestial, or theoretical horizon, part of the horizontal coordinate system, which is an infinite eye-level plane perpendicular to a line that runs (a) from the center of a celestial body (b) through the observer and (c) out to space (see graphic above). It is used to calculate "horizon dip," which is the difference between the astronomical horizon and the sea horizon measured in arcs. Horizon dip is one factor taken into account in navigation by the stars.

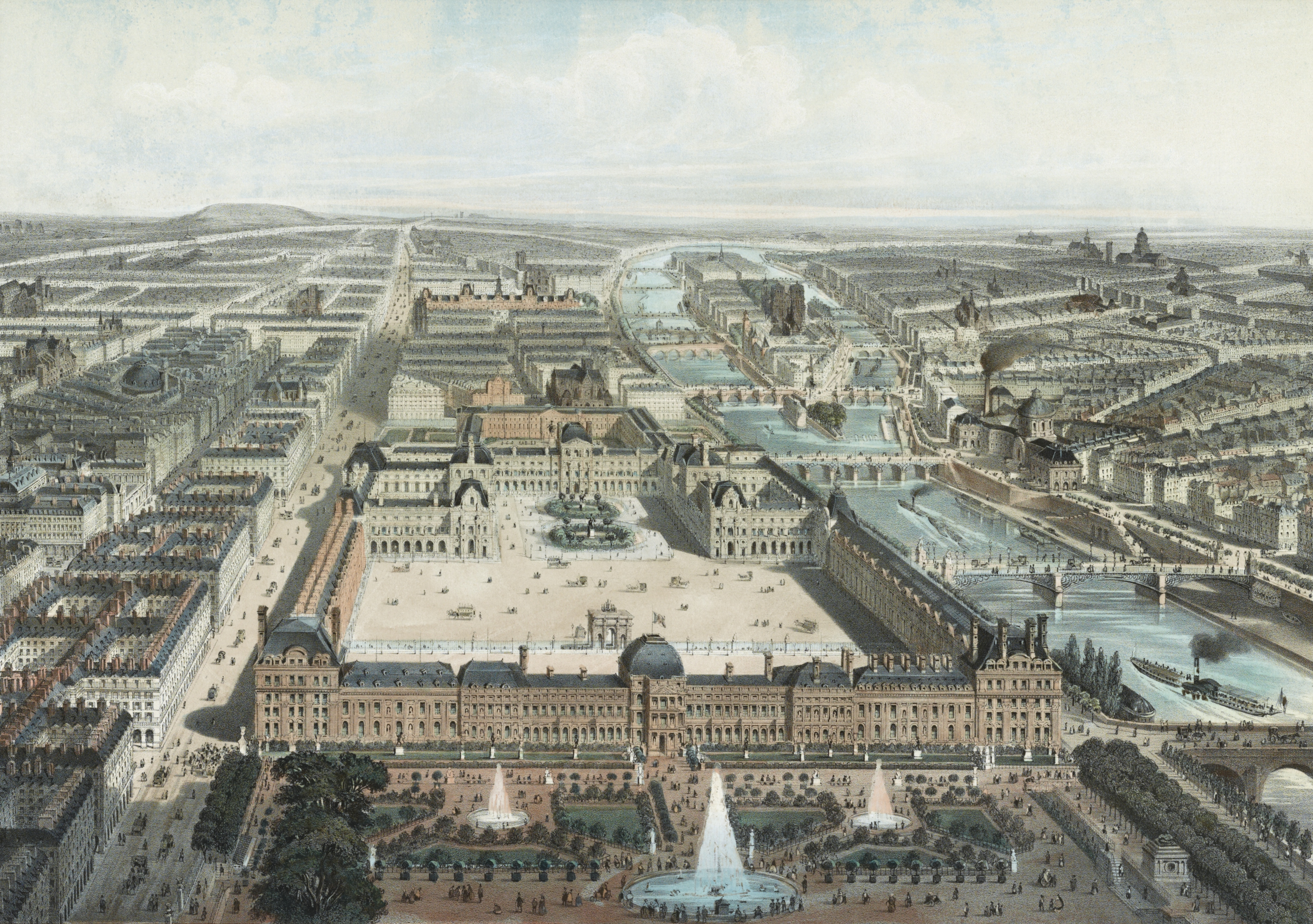
Bird's-eye view created with a horizon line above the subject of the scene (in this case, Paris in 1850).

In perspective drawing, the horizon line (also referred to as "eye-level") is the point of view from which the drawn scene is presented. It is an imaginary horizontal line across the scene. The line may be above, level with, or below the center of the drawing, corresponding to looking down, straight at, or up to the drawn scene. Vanishing lines run from the foreground to one or more vanishing points on the horizon line.

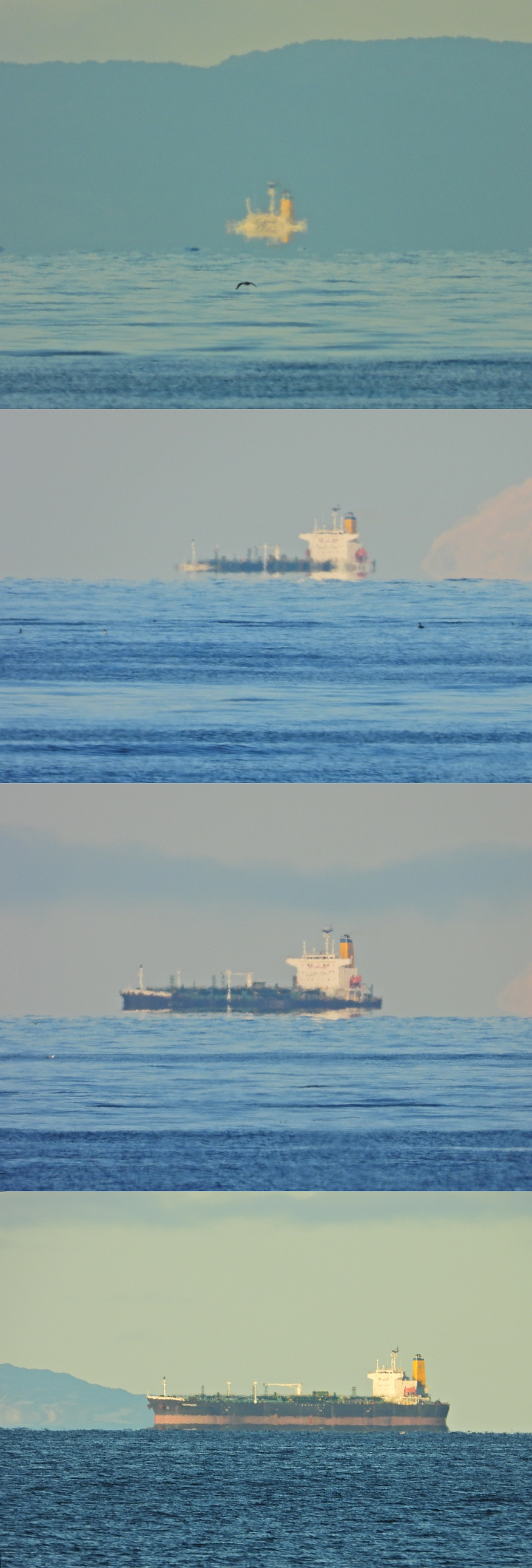
A sequence of pictures taken at Strait of Magellan, Chile, showing a tanker ship sailing towards the camera and rising over the horizon, demonstrating the Earth's curvature. Distance at first picture is about 18 km which would imply a theoretical horizon vertical drop of about 23 meters. Ship length is 186 m.

== Etymology ==
The word horizon derives from the Greek ὁρίζων κύκλος (horízōn kýklos) 'separating circle', where ὁρίζων is from the verb ὁρίζω (horízō) '(I) divide, (I) separate', which in turn derives from ὅρος (hóros) 'boundary, landmark'.

== True horizon ==
The true horizon surrounds the observer and it is typically assumed to be a circle, drawn on the surface of a perfectly spherical model of the relevant celestial body, i.e., a small circle of the local osculating sphere. With respect to Earth, the center of the true horizon is below the observer and below sea level. Its radius or horizontal distance from the observer varies slightly from day to day due to atmospheric refraction, which is greatly affected by weather conditions. Also, the higher the observer's eyes are from sea level, the farther away the horizon is from the observer. For instance, in standard atmospheric conditions, for an observer with eye level above sea level by 1.8 metres (6 ft), the horizon is at a distance of about 4.8 kilometres (3 mi).

When observed from very high standpoints, such as a space station, the horizon is much farther away and it encompasses a much larger area of Earth's surface. In this case, the horizon would no longer be a perfect circle, not even a plane curve such as an ellipse, especially when the observer is above the equator, as the Earth's surface can be better modeled as an oblate ellipsoid than as a sphere.

=== Distance to the horizon ===
==== Formula ====
Calculator
Radius	6371009 m
Height	2 m
Distance	5048 m

The distance to the true (geometric) horizon (not accounting for atmospheric refraction) from an observer at height $h$ above the surface of a celestial body assumed to be perfectly spherical can be calculated using the formula:

$d = \sqrt{2Rh + h^2}$

Where:

- $d$ is the distance to the true (geometric) horizon;
- $R$ is the radius of the assumed body, e.g., the Earth's arithmetic mean radius of 6,371,008.77138 meters (≈20,902,259.74862 ft);
- $h$ is the height of the observer above the surface, e.g., the Earth's orthometric height (height above mean sea level).

==== Examples ====
Assuming no atmospheric refraction and a spherical Earth with radius R=6,371 kilometres (3,959 mi):

- For an observer standing on the ground with h = 1.70 metres (5 ft 7 in), the horizon is at a distance of 4.7 kilometres (2.9 mi).
- For an observer standing on the ground with h = 2 metres (6 ft 7 in), the horizon is at a distance of 5 kilometres (3.1 mi).
- For an observer standing on a hill or tower 30 metres (98 ft) above sea level, the horizon is at a distance of 19.6 kilometres (12.2 mi).
- For an observer standing on a hill or tower 100 metres (330 ft) above sea level, the horizon is at a distance of 36 kilometres (22 mi).
- For an observer standing on the roof of the Burj Khalifa, 828 metres (2,717 ft) from ground, and about 834 metres (2,736 ft) above sea level, the horizon is at a distance of 103 kilometres (64 mi).
- For an observer atop Mount Everest (8,848 metres (29,029 ft) in altitude), the horizon is at a distance of 336 kilometres (209 mi).
- For an observer aboard a commercial passenger plane flying at a typical altitude of 35,000 feet (11,000 m), the horizon is at a distance of 369 kilometres (229 mi).
- For a U-2 pilot, whilst flying at its service ceiling 21,000 metres (69,000 ft), the horizon is at a distance of 517 kilometres (321 mi).

==== Other planets ====
On terrestrial planets and other solid celestial bodies with negligible atmospheric effects, the distance to the horizon for a "standard observer" varies as the square root of the planet's radius. Thus, the horizon on Mercury is 62% as far away from the observer as it is on Earth, on Mars the figure is 73%, on the Moon the figure is 52%, on Mimas the figure is 18%, and so on.

==== Derivation ====
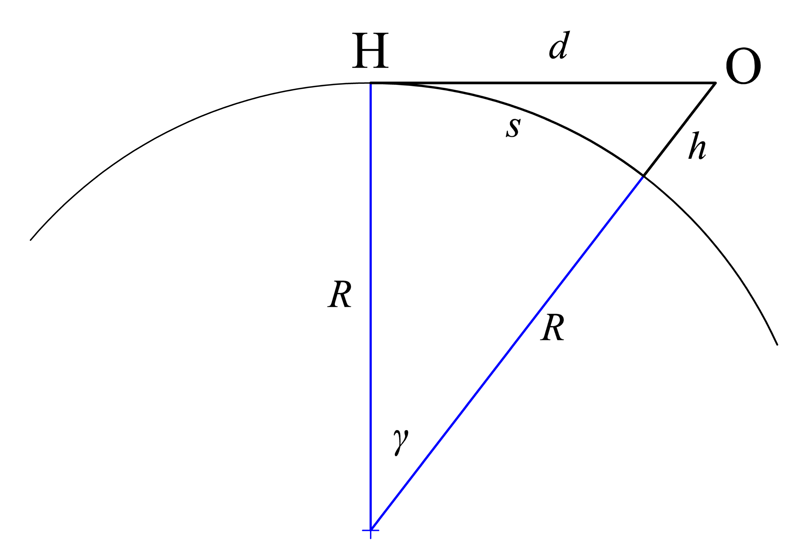
Geometrical distance to the horizon, Pythagorean theorem

If the Earth is assumed to be a featureless sphere (rather than an oblate spheroid) with no atmospheric refraction, then the distance to the horizon can be calculated. using the Pythagorean theorem. At the horizon, the line of sight is a tangent to the Earth and is also perpendicular to Earth's radius. This sets up a right triangle, with the sum of the radius and the height as the hypotenuse. With

- d = distance to the horizon
- h = height of the observer above sea level
- R = radius of the Earth

referring to the second figure at the right leads to the following:

$$(R+h)^2 = R^2 + d^2 \,\!$$

which may be solved to yield

$$d = \sqrt{2Rh + h^2} \,,$$

where R is the radius of the Earth (R and h must be in the same units). For example, if a satellite is at a height of 2000 km, the distance to the horizon is 5,430 kilometres (3,370 mi); neglecting the second term in parentheses would give a distance of 5,048 kilometres (3,137 mi), a 7% error.

==== Approximation ====
Graphs of distances to the true horizon on Earth for a given height h. s is along the surface of the Earth, d is the straight line distance, and ~d is the approximate straight line distance assuming h << the radius of the Earth, 6371 km. In the SVG image, hover over a graph to highlight it.

If the observer is close to the surface of the Earth, then h is a negligible fraction of R and the term h^2 can be disregarded in comparison to 2Rh. The formula becomes:

$$d = \sqrt{2Rh} \,.$$

Using kilometres for d and R, and metres for h, and taking the radius of the Earth as 6371 km, the distance to the horizon is

$$d \approx \sqrt{2\cdot6371\cdot{h/1000}} \approx 3.570\sqrt{h} \,$$.

Using imperial units, with d and R in statute miles (as commonly used on land), and h in feet, the distance to the horizon is

$$d \approx \sqrt{2\cdot3959\cdot{h/5280}} \approx \sqrt{1.5h} \approx 1.22 \sqrt{h}$$.

If d is in nautical miles, and h in feet, the constant factor is about 1.06, which is close enough to 1 that it is often ignored, giving:

$$d \approx \sqrt h$$

These formulas may be used when h is much smaller than the radius of the Earth (6371 km or 3959 mi), including all views from any mountaintops, airplanes, or high-altitude balloons. With the constants as given, both the metric and imperial formulas are precise to within 1% (see the next section for how to obtain greater precision). If h is significant with respect to R, as with most satellites, then the approximation is no longer valid, and the exact formula is required.

=== Related measures ===
==== Arc distance ====
Another relationship involves the great-circle distance s along the arc over the curved surface of the Earth to the horizon; this is more directly comparable to the geographical distance on maps.

It can be formulated in terms of γ in radians,

$$s = R \gamma \,;$$

then

$$\cos \gamma = \cos\frac{s}{R}=\frac{R}{R+h}\,.$$

Solving for s gives

$$s=R\cos^{-1}\frac{R}{R+h} \,.$$

The distance s can also be expressed in terms of the line-of-sight distance d; from the second figure at the right,

$$\tan \gamma = \frac {d} {R} \,;$$

substituting for γ and rearranging gives

$$s=R\tan^{-1}\frac{d}{R} \,.$$

The distances d and s are nearly the same when the height of the object is negligible compared to the radius (that is, h ≪ R).

==== Zenith angle ====
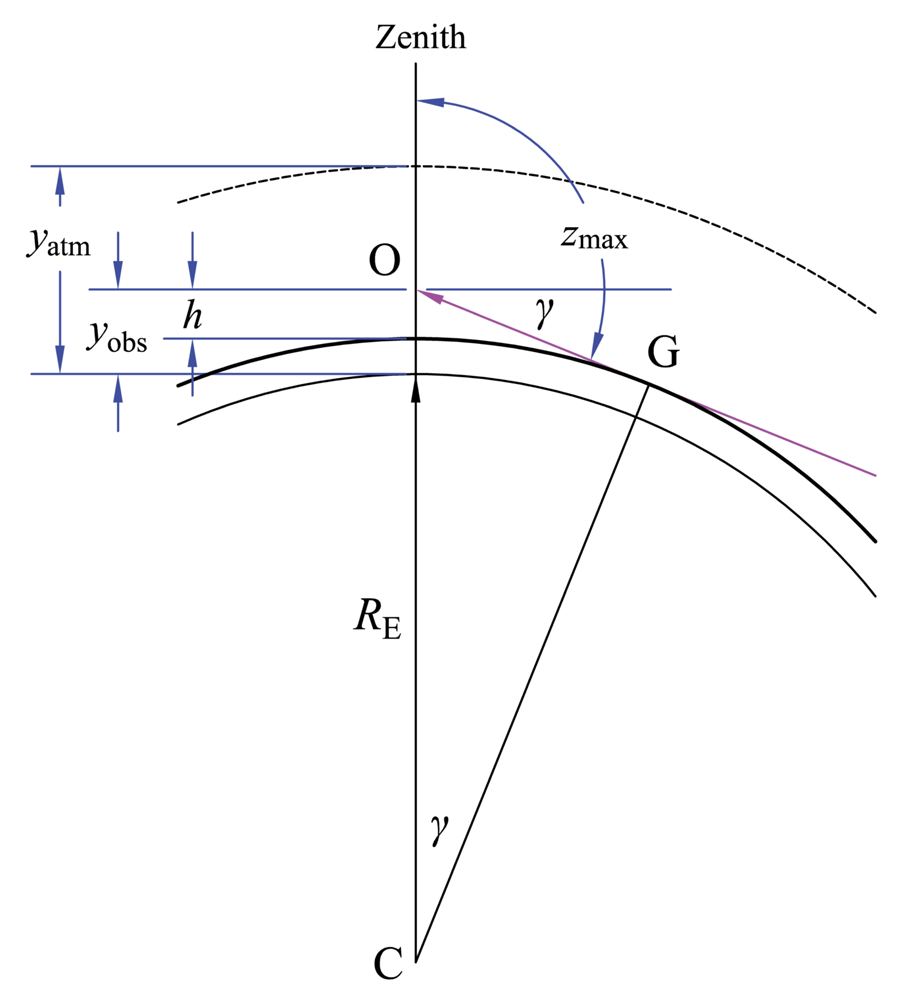
Maximum zenith angle for elevated observer in homogeneous spherical atmosphere

When the observer is elevated, the horizon zenith angle can be greater than 90°. The maximum visible zenith angle occurs when the ray is tangent to Earth's surface; from triangle OCG in the figure at right,

$$\cos \gamma =\frac{R}{R+h}$$

where $h$ is the observer's height above the surface and $\gamma$ is the angular dip of the horizon. It is related to the horizon zenith angle $z$ by:

$$z = \gamma +90{}^\circ$$

For a non-negative height $h$, the angle $z$ is always ≥ 90°.

=== Objects above the horizon ===
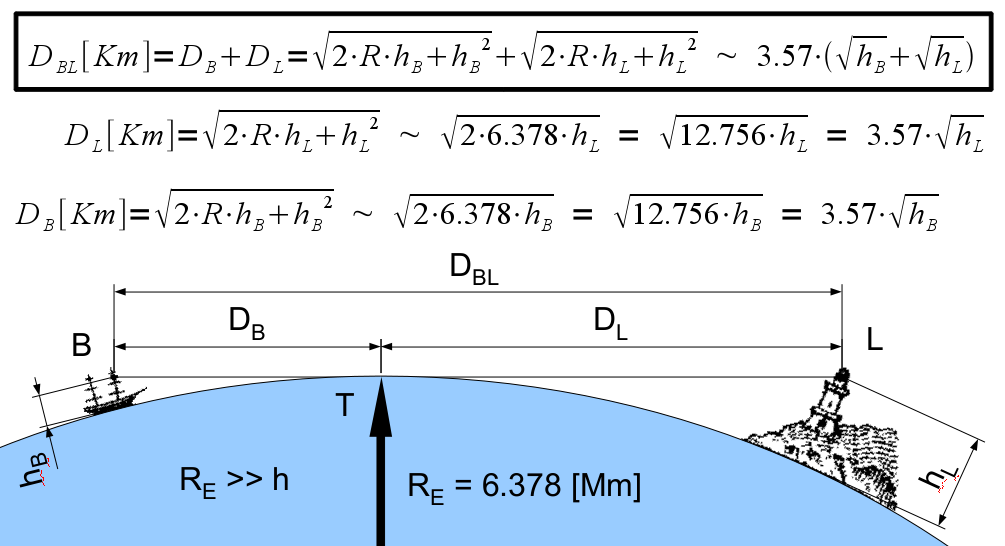
Geometrical horizon distance

To compute the greatest distance D_{BL} at which an observer B can see the top of an object L above the horizon, simply add the distances to the horizon from each of the two points:

D_{BL} = D_{B} + D_{L}

For example, for an observer B with a height of h_{B}=1.70 m standing on the ground, the horizon is D_{B}=4.65 km away. For a tower with a height of h_{L}=100 m, the horizon distance is D_{L}=35.7 km. Thus an observer on a beach can see the top of the tower as long as it is not more than D_{BL}=40.35 km away. Conversely, if an observer on a boat (h_{B}=1.7 m) can just see the tops of trees on a nearby shore (h_{L}=10 m), the trees are probably about D_{BL}=16 km away.

Referring to the figure at the right, and using the approximation above, the top of the lighthouse will be visible to a lookout in a crow's nest at the top of a mast of the boat if

$$D_\mathrm{BL} < 3.57\,(\sqrt{h_\mathrm{B}} + \sqrt{h_\mathrm{L}}) \,,$$

where D_{BL} is in kilometres and h_{B} and h_{L} are in metres.

A ship moving away, beyond the horizon

As another example, suppose an observer, whose eyes are two metres above the level ground, uses binoculars to look at a distant building which he knows to consist of thirty stories, each 3.5 metres high. He counts the stories he can see and finds there are only ten. So twenty stories or 70 metres of the building are hidden from him by the curvature of the Earth. From this, he can calculate his distance from the building:

$$D \approx 3.57(\sqrt{2}+\sqrt{70})$$

which comes to about 35 kilometres.

It is similarly possible to calculate how much of a distant object is visible above the horizon. Suppose an observer's eye is 10 metres above sea level, and he is watching a ship that is 20 km away. His horizon is:

$$3.57 \sqrt{10}$$

kilometres from him, which comes to about 11.3 kilometres away. The ship is a further 8.7 km away. The height of a point on the ship that is just visible to the observer is given by:

$$h\approx\left(\frac{8.7}{3.57}\right)^2$$

which comes to almost exactly six metres. The observer can therefore see that part of the ship that is more than six metres above the level of the water. The part of the ship that is below this height is hidden from him by the curvature of the Earth. In this situation, the ship is said to be hull-down.

== Refracted horizon ==
Historically, the distance to the refracted horizon has long been vital to survival and successful navigation, especially at sea, because it determined an observer's maximum range of vision and thus of communication, with all the obvious consequences for safety and the transmission of information that this range implied. This importance lessened with the development of the radio and the telegraph, but even today, when flying an aircraft under visual flight rules, a technique called attitude flying is used to control the aircraft, where the pilot uses the visual relationship between the aircraft's nose and the horizon to control the aircraft. Pilots can also retain their spatial orientation by referring to the horizon.

=== Effect of atmospheric refraction ===
Due to atmospheric refraction the distance to the visible horizon is further than the distance based on a simple geometric calculation. If the ground (or water) surface is colder than the air above it, a cold, dense layer of air forms close to the surface, causing light to be refracted downward as it travels, and therefore, to some extent, to go around the curvature of the Earth. The reverse happens if the ground is hotter than the air above it, as often happens in deserts, producing mirages. As an approximate compensation for refraction, surveyors measuring distances longer than 100 meters subtract 14% from the calculated curvature error and ensure lines of sight are at least 1.5 metres from the ground, to reduce random errors created by refraction.

If the Earth were an airless world like the Moon, the above calculations would be accurate. However, Earth has an atmosphere of air, whose density and refractive index vary considerably depending on the temperature and pressure. This makes the air refract light to varying extents, affecting the appearance of the horizon. Usually, the density of the air just above the surface of the Earth is greater than its density at greater altitudes. This makes its refractive index greater near the surface than at higher altitudes, which causes light that is travelling roughly horizontally to be refracted downward. This makes the actual distance to the horizon greater than the distance calculated with geometrical formulas. With standard atmospheric conditions, the difference is about 8%. This changes the factor of 3.57, in the metric formulas used above, to about 3.86. For instance, if an observer is standing on seashore, with eyes 1.70 m above sea level, according to the simple geometrical formulas given above the horizon should be 4.7 km away. Actually, atmospheric refraction allows the observer to see 300 metres farther, moving the true horizon 5 km away from the observer.

This correction can be, and often is, applied as a fairly good approximation when atmospheric conditions are close to standard. When conditions are unusual, this approximation fails. Refraction is strongly affected by temperature gradients, which can vary considerably from day to day, especially over water. In extreme cases, usually in springtime, when warm air overlies cold water, refraction can allow light to follow the Earth's surface for hundreds of kilometres. Opposite conditions occur, for example, in deserts, where the surface is very hot, so hot, low-density air is below cooler air. This causes light to be refracted upward, causing mirage effects that make the concept of the horizon somewhat meaningless. Calculated values for the effects of refraction under unusual conditions are therefore only approximate. Nevertheless, attempts have been made to calculate them more accurately than the simple approximation described above.

Outside the visual wavelength range, refraction will be different. For radar (e.g. for wavelengths 300 to 3 mm i.e. frequencies between 1 and 100 GHz) the radius of the Earth may be multiplied by 4/3 to obtain an effective radius giving a factor of 4.12 in the metric formula i.e. the radar horizon will be 15% beyond the geometrical horizon or 7% beyond the visual. The 4/3 factor is not exact, as in the visual case the refraction depends on atmospheric conditions.

Integration method—Sweer

If the density profile of the atmosphere is known, the distance d to the horizon is given by

$$d={{R}_{\text{E}}}\left( \psi +\delta  \right) \,,$$

where R_{E} is the radius of the Earth, ψ is the dip of the horizon and δ is the refraction of the horizon. The dip is determined fairly simply from

$$\cos \psi = \frac{{R}_{\text{E}}{\mu}_{0}}{\left( {{R}_{\text{E}}}+h \right)\mu } \,,$$

where h is the observer's height above the Earth, μ is the index of refraction of air at the observer's height, and μ_{0} is the index of refraction of air at Earth's surface.

The refraction must be found by integration of

$$\delta =-\int_{0}^{h}{\tan \phi \frac{\text{d}\mu }{\mu }} \,,$$

where $\phi\,\!$ is the angle between the ray and a line through the center of the Earth. The angles ψ and $\phi\,\!$ are related by

$$\phi =90{}^\circ -\psi \,.$$

Simple method—Young

A much simpler approach, which produces essentially the same results as the first-order approximation described above, uses the geometrical model but uses a radius R′ = 7/6 R_{E}. The distance to the horizon is then

$$d=\sqrt{2 R^\prime h} \,.$$

Taking the radius of the Earth as 6371 km, with d in km and h in m,

$$d \approx 3.86 \sqrt{h} \,;$$

with d in mi and h in ft,

$$d \approx 1.32 \sqrt{h} \,.$$

In the case of radar one typically has R′ = 4/3 R_{E} resulting (with d in km and h in m) in

$$d \approx 4.12 \sqrt{h} \,;$$

Results from Young's method are quite close to those from Sweer's method, and are sufficiently accurate for many purposes.

== Astronomical horizon ==
In astronomy, the horizon is the horizontal plane through the eyes of the observer. It is the fundamental plane of the horizontal coordinate system, the locus of points that have an altitude of zero degrees. While similar in ways to the geometrical horizon, in this context a horizon may be considered to be a plane in space, rather than a line on a picture plane.

== Perspective ==
In many contexts, especially perspective drawing, the curvature of the Earth is disregarded and the horizon is considered the theoretical line to which points on any horizontal plane converge (when projected onto the picture plane) as their distance from the observer increases. For observers near sea level, the difference between this geometrical horizon (which assumes a perfectly flat, infinite ground plane) and the true horizon (which assumes a spherical Earth surface) is imperceptible to the unaided eye. However, for someone on a 1,000 m (3,300 ft) hill looking out across the sea, the true horizon will be about a degree below a horizontal line.

=== Vanishing points ===
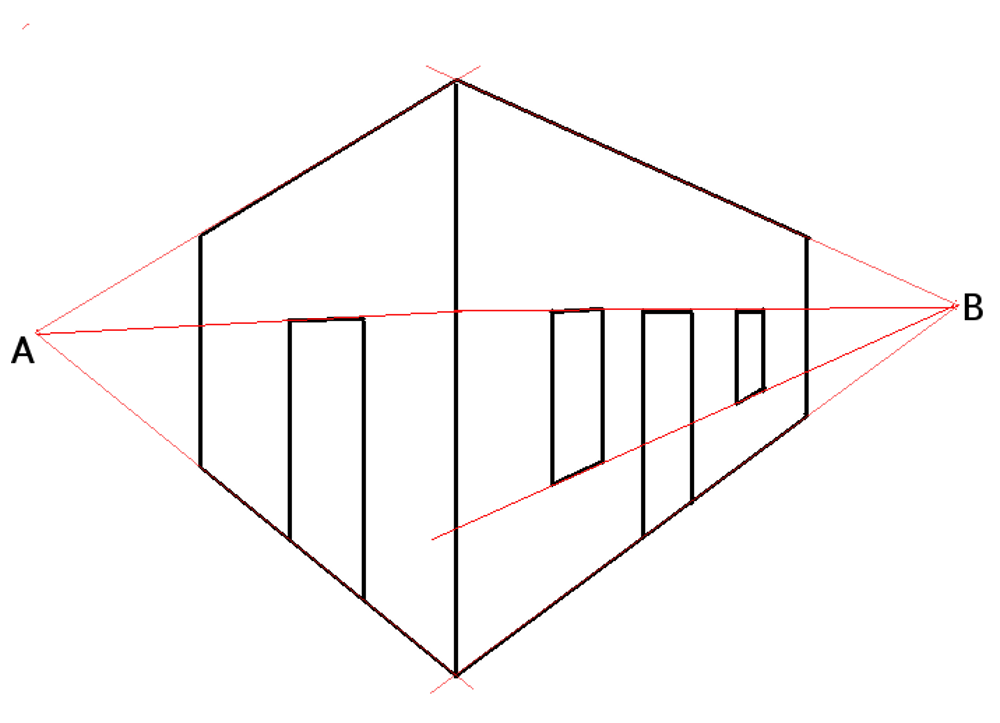
Two points on the horizon are at the intersections of the lines extending the segments representing the edges of the building in the foreground. The horizon line coincides here with the line at the top of the doors and windows.

The horizon is a key feature of the picture plane in the science of graphical perspective. Assuming the picture plane stands vertical to ground, and P is the perpendicular projection of the eye point O on the picture plane, the horizon is defined as the horizontal line through P. The point P is the vanishing point of lines perpendicular to the picture. If S is another point on the horizon, then it is the vanishing point for all lines parallel to OS. But Brook Taylor indicated that the horizon plane determined by O and the horizon was like any other plane:

The term of Horizontal Line, for instance, is apt to confine the Notions of a Learner to the Plane of the Horizon, and to make him imagine, that that Plane enjoys some particular Privileges, which make the Figures in it more easy and more convenient to be described, by the means of that Horizontal Line, than the Figures in any other plane;…But in this Book I make no difference between the Plane of the Horizon, and any other Plane whatsoever...

The peculiar geometry of perspective where parallel lines converge in the distance, stimulated the development of projective geometry which posits a point at infinity where parallel lines meet. In her book The Geometry of an Art (2007), Kirsti Andersen described the evolution of perspective drawing and science up to 1800, noting that vanishing points need not be on the horizon. In a chapter titled "Horizon", John Stillwell recounted how projective geometry has led to incidence geometry, the modern abstract study of line intersection. Stillwell also ventured into foundations of mathematics in a section titled "What are the Laws of Algebra ?" The "algebra of points", originally given by Karl von Staudt deriving the axioms of a field was deconstructed in the twentieth century, yielding a wide variety of mathematical possibilities. Stillwell states

This discovery from 100 years ago seems capable of turning mathematics upside down, though it has not yet been fully absorbed by the mathematical community. Not only does it defy the trend of turning geometry into algebra, it suggests that both geometry and algebra have a simpler foundation than previously thought.

== See also ==
- Aerial landscape art
- Atmospheric refraction
- Dawn
- Dusk
- Horizontal and vertical
- Landscape
  - Landscape art
- Limb - in astronomy, the apparent visual edge of a celestial body
  - Limb darkening
  - Lunar limb
- Radar horizon
- Radio horizon
- Sextant
- Skyline
