= Bundesautobahn 38 =

Federal motorway in Germany

A 38
- Bundesautobahn 38

Route information
- Length: 208 km (129 mi)

Major junctions
- West end: A 7 near Göttingen
- East end: A 14 in Leipzig

Location
- Country: Germany
- States: Lower Saxony, Hesse, Thuringia, Saxony-Anhalt, Saxony

Highway system
- Roads in Germany; Autobahns; List; Federal; List; State; E-roads
← A 37	→ A 39

Bundesautobahn 38 (translates from German as Federal Motorway 38, short form Autobahn 38, abbreviated as BAB 38 or A 38) is an autobahn in Germany. It connects the A 7 near Göttingen with Leipzig.

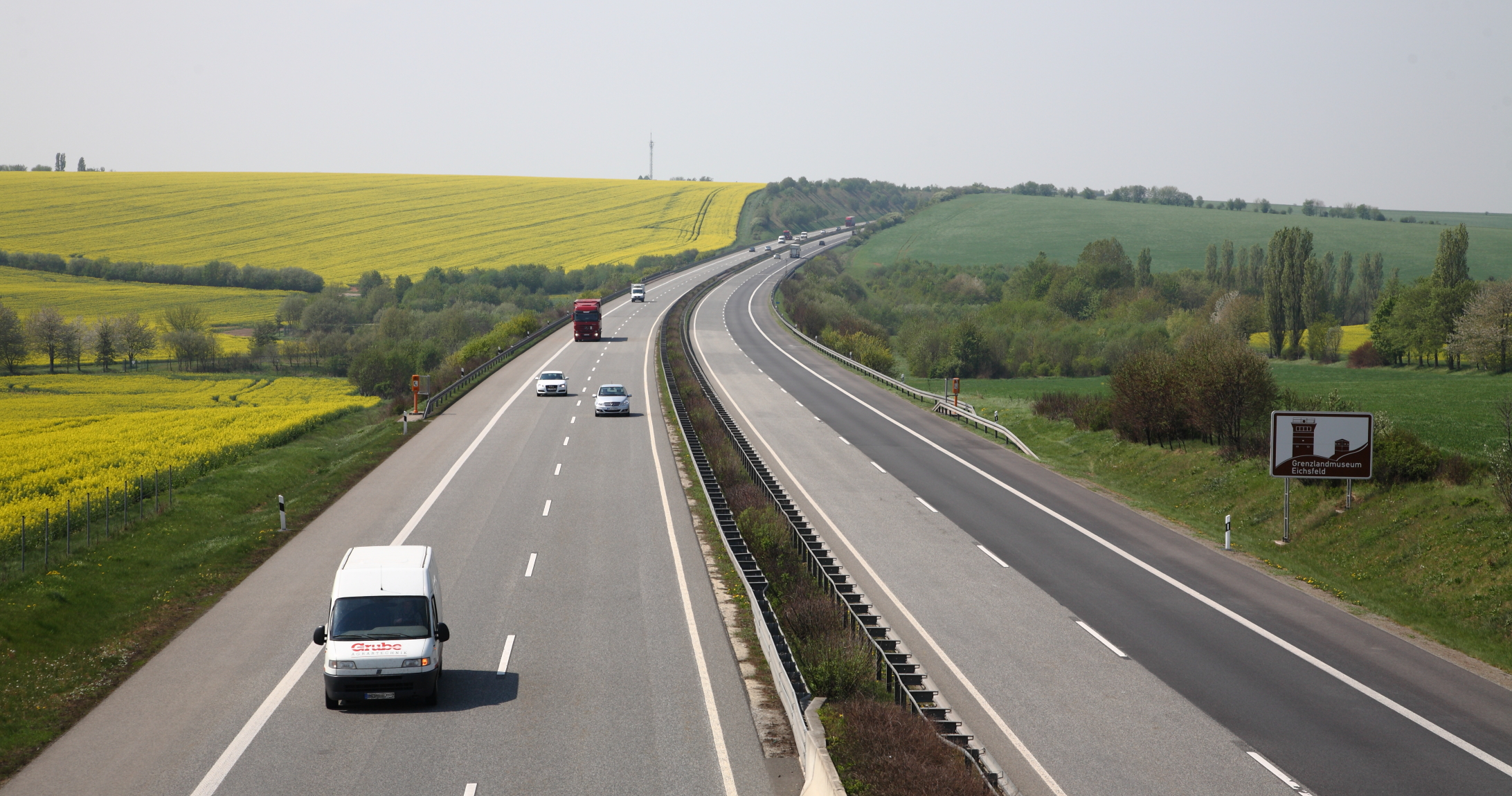
A 38 in Eichsfeld County

== Exit list ==
Legend:

- I/C - Interchange, I/S - Intersection, RSA - Rest and service area, OBR - Overhead bridge restaurant, R/R - Restaurant and rest plaza, L/B - Layby, V/P - Vista point, TN - tunnel, T/P - Toll plaza, BR - Bridge
- C - Cloverleaf, S - Stack, T-A - Trumpet-A, T-B - Trumpet-B, DT - Directional-T/Y, SDT - Semi-Directional-T/Y, P-Y - Partial-Y, D - Diamond, P-C - Partial cloverleaf, D-D - Diverging diamond, D-R - Direct ramp

(1)	Drammetal 3-way interchange A 7
(2a)	Dramfeld
(2b)	Deiderode
(3)	Friedland B 27
	Leinebrücke
	Heidkopftunnel (Tunnel der deutschen Einheit) 1724 m
(4)	Arenshausen B 80
	Abendtalbrücke 200 m
	Bebertalbrücke 250 m
(5)	Heilbad Heiligenstadt
	Steinbachtalbrücke 372 m
	Etzelsbachtalbrücke 523 m
(6)	Leinefelde-Worbis B 247
	Wipperbrücke
	Services Eichsfeld
(7)	Breitenworbis
	Rhintalbrücke 310 m
	Höllbergtunnel 880 m
	Friedetalbrücke 485 m
(8)	Bleicherode
	Wippertalbrücke 110 m
	Wippertalbrücke 124 m
(9)	Großwechsungen B 247
	Talbrücke Rodengraben 202 m
(10)	Nordhausen-West
(11)	Nordhausen B 4
(12)	Heringen
	Hungerbachtalbrücke 375 m
	Thyratalbrücke 1115 m
(13)	Berga B 85
	Talbrücke Taubentalsbach 263 m
	Talbrücke Weidengraben 352 m
(14)	Roßla
	Talbrücke Dittichenroder Bach 116 m
(15)	Sangerhausen-West
(16)	Sangerhausen-Süd B 86
	Talbrücke Einzinger Bach 332 m
(17)	Südharz 3-way interchange A 71
(18)	Allstedt
	Services Rohnetal
(19)	Lutherstadt Eisleben B 180
	Weitzschkerbachtalbrücke 598 m
(20)	Querfurt
	Weidatalbrücke 456 m
(21)	Schafstädt
(22)	Halle-Süd 3-way interchange A 143
(23)	Bad Lauchstädt
(24)	Merseburg-Nord
(25)	Merseburg-Süd
(26)	Leuna B 91
	Saaletalbrücke Schkortleben 860 m
(27)	Rippachtal 4-way interchange A 9
(28)	Lützen
(29)	Leipzig-Südwest B 186
	Weiße-Elster-Brücke 292 m
(30)	Leipzig-Neue Harth / Belantis theme park
	Gaschwitzer Brücke 455 m
(31)	Leipzig-Süd 4-way interchange A 72
(32)	Leipzig-Südost
	Brücke 60 m
(33)	Parthenaue 3-way interchange A 14
