= Großgörschen =

- Stadtteil of Lützen
- Interactive map of Großgörschen
- Location within Germany Location within Saxony-Anhalt
- Coordinates: 51°13′N 12°11′E
- Country: Germany
- State: Saxony-Anhalt
- District: Burgenlandkreis
- Town: Lützen

Area
  - Total: 15.00 km^{2} (5.79 sq mi)
- Elevation: 154 m (505 ft)

Population (2006-12-31)
  - Total: 851
  - Density: 56.7/km^{2} (147/sq mi)
- Time zone: UTC+01:00 (CET)
  - Summer (DST): UTC+02:00 (CEST)
- Postal codes: 06686
- Dialling codes: 034444

Großgörschen is a village and a former municipality in the Burgenlandkreis district, in Saxony-Anhalt, Germany.

Since 1 January 2010, it is part of the town Lützen.

== See also ==
Battle of Lützen (1813)
