= Thomas Tuke =

Thomas Tuke may refer to:

- Thomas Harrington Tuke (1826–1888), British physician
- Thomas Tuke (writer) (c.1580–1657), English clergyman and controversial writer
