= Hexham (disambiguation) =

Hexham is a market town in Northumberland, England.

Hexham may also refer to:

== Other places ==
- Hexham, New South Wales, a suburb of the Australian city of Newcastle
- Hexham, Victoria, a town in Australia
- Hexham (UK Parliament constituency), a parliamentary constituency containing the town in Northumberland

== People with the surname ==
- Henry Hexham (c. 1585–1650), English military writer
- Irving Hexham (born 1943), English-Canadian academic and writer
