= The Geometry of an Art =

The Geometry of an Art: The History of the Mathematical Theory of Perspective from Alberti to Monge
- Author: Kirsti Andersen
- Language: English
- Series: Sources and Studies in the History of Mathematics and Physical Sciences
- Subject: History of the mathematics of graphical perspective
- Publisher: Springer-Verlag
- Publication date: 2007
- Pages: 812
- ISBN: 978-0-387-25961-1

The Geometry of an Art: The History of the Mathematical Theory of Perspective from Alberti to Monge is a book in the history of mathematics, on the mathematics of graphical perspective. It was written by Kirsti Andersen, and published in 2007 by Springer-Verlag in their book series Sources and Studies in the History of Mathematics and Physical Sciences.

== Topics ==
This book covers a wide span of mathematical history, from 1435 to 1800, and a wide field of "around 250 publications by more than 200 authors". After three introductory chapters on the beginnings of perspective with the works of Leon Battista Alberti, Piero della Francesca, Leonardo da Vinci, and others from their time, the remainder of the book is organized geographically rather than chronologically, in order to set the works it discusses into their local context. Thus, Chapter 4 covers the spread of perspective among the artists and artisans of 15th-century Italy, including the works of Luca Pacioli and Daniele Barbaro, while Chapter 5 concerns developments in Northern Europe in the same timeframe by Albrecht Dürer, Wenzel Jamnitzer, and Paul Vredeman de Vries, among others.

In what reviewer Riccardo Bellé calls "the core of the book", chapters 6 through 12 cover the developments of the theory by Guidobaldo del Monte, Simon Stevin, Willem 's Gravesande, and Brook Taylor. Again, after an initial chapter on del Monte's discovery of the vanishing point and Stevin's mathematical explication of del Monte's work, these chapters are divided geographically. Chapter 7 concerns the Netherlands, including the Dutch painters of the 17th century, the book on perspective by Samuel Marolois, and the work of 's Gravesande. Chapter 8 returns to Italy, and the work of architects and stage designers there, including Andrea Pozzo among the Jesuits. Chapter 9 covers over 40 works from France and Belgium, including the anonymously-published work of Jean Du Breuil, who brought the Jesuit knowledge of architecture from Italy to France, and the work on anamorphosis by Jean François Niceron. This chapter also covers Girard Desargues, although it disagrees with the widely-held opinion that Desargues was the inventor of projective geometry. Chapter 10, the longest of the book, concerns Britain, including Taylor, and his followers. Chapters 11 and 12 both concern the German-speaking countries, with Chapter 12 focusing on Johann Heinrich Lambert, who "concluded the process of understanding the geometry behind perspective by creating perspectival geometry".

A penultimate chapter concerns Gaspard Monge, the development of descriptive geometry, and its relation to the earlier perspective geometry and projective geometry. After a final summary chapter, the book includes four appendices and two bibliographies. The book is illustrated with over 600 black and white images, some from the works described and others new-created visualizations of their mathematical concepts, with older diagrams consistently relabeled to make their common features more apparent.

From this history, reviewer Jeremy Gray draws several interesting conclusions: that, after their initial joint formulation, the mathematical and artistic aspects of the subject remained more or less separate, with later developments in mathematics having little influence on artistic practice, that (despite frequent accounts of their being directly connected) the earlier work on perspective geometry had little influence on the creation of projective geometry, and that despite covering so many contributors to this history, Andersen could find no women among them.

== Audience and reception ==
Reviewer Christa Binder describes this book as Kirsti Andersen's life work and the "definitive reference work on perspective, a classic in its field". Riccardo Bellé recommends the book to "a wide range of scholars, especially historians of mathematics, historians of art, historians of architecture", but also to practitioners of architecture, engineering, or perspective art, and to art teachers. Philip J. Davis recommends it to anyone who wishes to understand the roots of contemporary computer graphics. Gray calls it "a remarkable piece of historical research" that "will surely become the definitive text on the subject".

However, although finding the book clearly written and comprehensive as a history of perspective, reviewer Greg St. George warns against trying to use this book as an introduction to the mathematics of perspective, for which a more focused text would be more appropriate. Similarly, Judith V. Field finds that the book's attempts to make the mathematics more clear, by unifying its notation and terminology and basing its explanations on modern mathematical treatments, tend to muddle its treatment of the history and historical sources of the subject. Field also takes fault with the book's superficial and dismissive treatment of Desargues, with its uncritical reliance on modern sources that Field considers dubious such as the work of Morris Kline, with its "coy refusal" to draw conclusions from the story it tells, and with its publisher's poor copyediting.
