= Michael-Christfried Winkler =

German organist, conductor and academic teacher

Michael-Christfried Winkler (born 18 March 1946) is a German organist, conductor and academic teacher.

== Life ==
Born in Zorbau near Weißenfels, Winkler studied Protestant church music with a focus on the organ in Halle, Leipzig and Prague. From 1970 to 1982 he was cantor and organist in Köthen. In 1980 he was appointed director of church music and in 1983 organist in Dresden. In addition to playing the organ during church services and the Kreuzchor vespers, he regularly gave organ concerts in Kreuzkirche.

Winkler taught at the Hochschule für Kirchenmusik Dresden, at the musicological institute of the Technical University of Dresden and until his retirement in June 2001 at the Hochschule für Musik Carl Maria von Weber. In 2002 Winkler was appointed honorary professor by Saxony.

In 1994 Winkler was awarded the Kunstpreis der Landeshauptstadt Dresden.

== Literature ==
Über Winkler-Aufführungen des Dresdner Kreuzchores, in Matthias Herrmann (ed.): Dresdner Kreuzchor und zeitgenössische Chormusik. Ur- und Erstaufführungen zwischen Richter und Kreile, Marburg 2017, pp. 134, 142–144, 289, 322, 324 (Schriften des Dresdner Kreuzchores, vol. 2)
