= Jesper Lützen =

Danish mathematician (born 1951)

Jesper Lützen (born 8 October 1951 in Svendborg) is a Danish historian of mathematics and the physical sciences.

== Biography ==
Lützen graduated in mathematics (with a minor in physics) in 1976 from Aarhus University, where he also earned his PhD in 1980 in the history of science under the supervision of Kirsti Andersen. In 1980 he was a visiting scholar at Yale University (studying under Asger Aaboe) and became a temporary lecturer (a temporary assistant professor position) at Odense University and from 1985 a lecturer at the University of Copenhagen. In 1990 he received his habilitation (Doctor Scientiarum) from the University of Copenhagen. There he has been a lecturer since 1989 and since 2005 a professor of mathematics history at the University of Copenhagen's Faculty of Mathematics. He has been a visiting scholar at Utrecht (studying with Henk Bos) and at several other places: Paris, MIT's Dibner Institute, the Mittag-Leffler Institute of the Royal Swedish Academy of Sciences, the California Institute of Technology, the University of California, Santa Barbara, and the University of Toronto.

Lützen's research deals with the prehistory of distributions (before their precisely defined introduction by Sergei Sobolev around 1936 and Laurent Schwartz around 1950), as well as Joseph Liouville (whose biography he wrote) and Heinrich Hertz and Hertz's mechanics. The prehistory of the theory of distributions was also the topic of Lützen's dissertation.

He is a co-editor of the Archive for History of Exact Sciences, Historia Mathematica, and the Revue d'histoire des mathématiques, as well as Springer Verlag's book series Archimedes: New Sources and Studies in the History of Mathematics and Physical Sciences with series editor Jed Buchwald.

In 1990, Lützen was an Invited Speaker at the International Congress of Mathematicians in Kyoto. Since 1993 he has been a full member of the International Academy of the History of Science (previously a corresponding member since 1988). He is, since 1986, a member of the Danish National Committee for the History and Philosophy of Science and is, since 1990, the Danish representative in the International Commission on the History of Mathematics. He was elected in 1996 a member of the Royal Danish Academy of Sciences and Letters and in 2012 a Fellow of the American Mathematical Society. He is a member of the USA-based History of Science Society and a member of the Danish Mathematical Society. He is also a member of the Danish Society for the History of Science, whose president he was from 1995 to 2006 and whose secretary he has been since 2007.

He is married since 1990 and has three daughters.

== Selected publications ==
- Mechanistic images in geometric form: Heinrich Hertz's principles of mechanics, Oxford University Press 2005
- The Prehistory of the Theory of Distributions, Studies in the History of Mathematics and the Physical Sciences, Volume 7, Springer Verlag 1982; Lützen, J. (2012). Dover reprint. ISBN 9781461394723.
- Joseph Liouville 1809–1882. Master of pure and applied mathematics, Springer Verlag 1990
- Heaviside's operational calculus and the attempts to rigorise it, Archive for History of Exact Sciences, Volume 21, 1979, pp. 161–200 doi:10.1007/BF00330405 (See Oliver Heaviside.)
- "Euler's vision of a general partial differential calculus for a generalized kind of function." Mathematics Magazine 56, no. 5 (1983): 299–306 doi:10.1080/0025570X.1983.11977061
- "Sturm and Liouville's work on ordinary linear differential equations. The emergence of Sturm-Liouville theory." Archive for History of Exact Sciences 29, no. 4 (1984): 309–376 doi:10.1007/BF00348405
- with Henk Bos and Kirsti Andersen: Træk af den matematiske analyses historie: En antologi af kilder og sekundær litteratur, Center for Vidensskabstudier, Aarhus University, 1987
- with H. Bos and K. Andersen: Træk af den ikke-Euklidiske geometris historie, University of Aarhus, Center for Vidensska Studies, 1997
- Interactions between mechanics and differential geometry in the 19th century, Archive for History of Exact Sciences, Vol. 49, 1995, pp. 1–72. doi:10.1007/BF00374699
- "Chapter 6. The foundation of analysis in the 19th century" by Jesper Lützen in A History of Analysis edited by Hans Niels Jahnke, American Mathematical Society/London Mathematical Society, 2003, 155–195; translated from the original German of Geschichte der Analysis, Spektrum Akademische Verlag, 1999.
