= Muschwitz =

- Stadtteil of Lützen
- Interactive map of Muschwitz
- Location within Germany Location within Saxony-Anhalt
- Coordinates: 51°12′N 12°7′E
- Country: Germany
- State: Saxony-Anhalt
- District: Burgenlandkreis
- Town: Lützen

Area
  - Total: 12.23 km^{2} (4.72 sq mi)
- Elevation: 144 m (472 ft)

Population (2006-12-31)
  - Total: 1,135
  - Density: 92.80/km^{2} (240.4/sq mi)
- Time zone: UTC+01:00 (CET)
  - Summer (DST): UTC+02:00 (CEST)
- Postal codes: 06679
- Dialling codes: 034441
- Vehicle registration: BLK

Muschwitz is a village and former municipality in the Burgenlandkreis district, in Saxony-Anhalt, Germany.

Since 1 January 2010, it is part of the town Lützen.
