= Georg Witzel =

German theologian

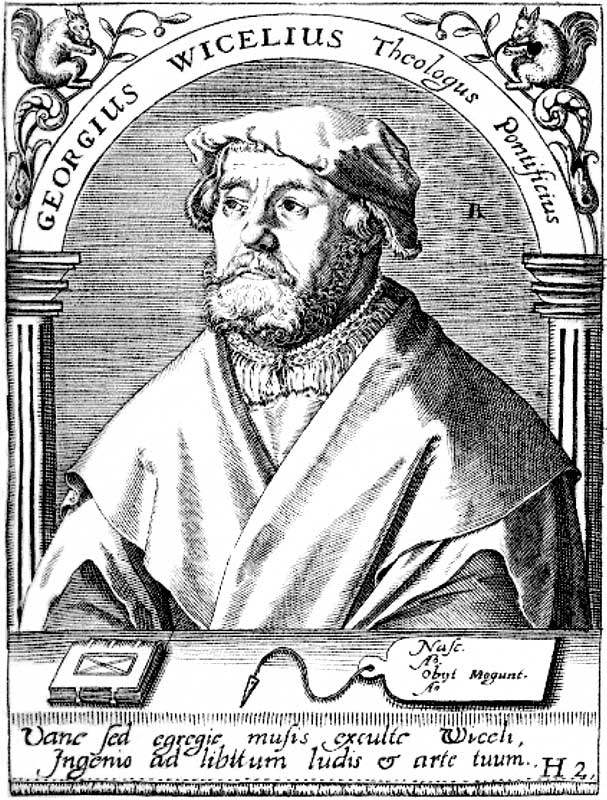
Georg Witzel (engraving 16th century)

Georg Witzel (Wizel, Wicel, Wicelius) (b. at Vacha, Landgraviate of Hesse, 1501; d. at Electorate of Mainz, 16 February 1573) was a German theologian.

== Life ==
He received his primary and academic education in the schools of Schmalkalden, Eisenach, and Halle, and then spent two years at the University of Erfurt, and seven months at the University of Wittenberg. In keeping with his father's wishes, Witzel was ordained a priest in 1520, and was appointed Vicar of Vacha. In 1524, however, the teachings of Martin Luther attracted him.

Abandoning the Catholic faith, he married, and the following year was appointed to the pastorate of Wenigenlupnitz by James Strauss, and a little later to that of Niemeck by Luther himself. He then began a thorough study of the Scriptures and the Church Fathers, and soon became convinced that the Church of Luther was not the true Church and that Lutheran morals did not make for the betterment of the people. To express his dissatisfaction with the new teaching, he wrote in 1527 two works which he sent to the theologians of Wittenberg without, however, receiving any satisfaction from them.

To give more emphatic expression to his conviction of the error of the new religion, he resigned his charge in 1531 and returned with his family to Vacha. Here he spent two years in extreme poverty. In 1532 he published, under the pseudonym Agricola Phaqus, his Pro defensione bonorum operum, a work which aroused all the bitterness of his enemies. Among his works published at this time his Apologia (Leipzig, 1533) deserves special mention, since in it he gives his reasons for returning to the Church of Rome.

Owing to Witzel's opposition to the doctrinal novelties of the age, he was forced to leave Vacha. He proceeded to Eisleben, and in 1538 was called to Dresden. Here he conceived a plan of reunion, which took the form of a public disputation in Leipzig in 1539. He had already (1537) published his Methodus concordiae ecclesiasticae, and for the new disputation he prepared Typus prioris Ecclesiae in which he proposed the Church of the first centuries as the ideal to be sought for. His endeavours for reunion, however, were without result. Opposition forced him to flee to Bohemia, thence to Berlin. The rapid progress of Protestantism soon convinced him that here too his efforts would be fruitless, and he forthwith proceeded to Fulda, where he directed his efforts towards defending the Church; but in 1554 he was again forced to flee, now to Mainz, where he spent the remainder of his life in literary work and probably as professor at the university of Mainz.

== Works ==
The number of Witzel's works is extraordinarily large. Andreas Räss in his Convertiten enumerates ninety-four, but this is far from complete.

He contributed to Michael Vehe's hymnbook (1537). He supported using the German vernacular for hymns, psalms, and liturgy.

== Notes ==
Attribution
