= Battle of Lützen (1813) =

1813 battle during the War of the Sixth Coalition

- Part of the German campaign of the War of the Sixth Coalition
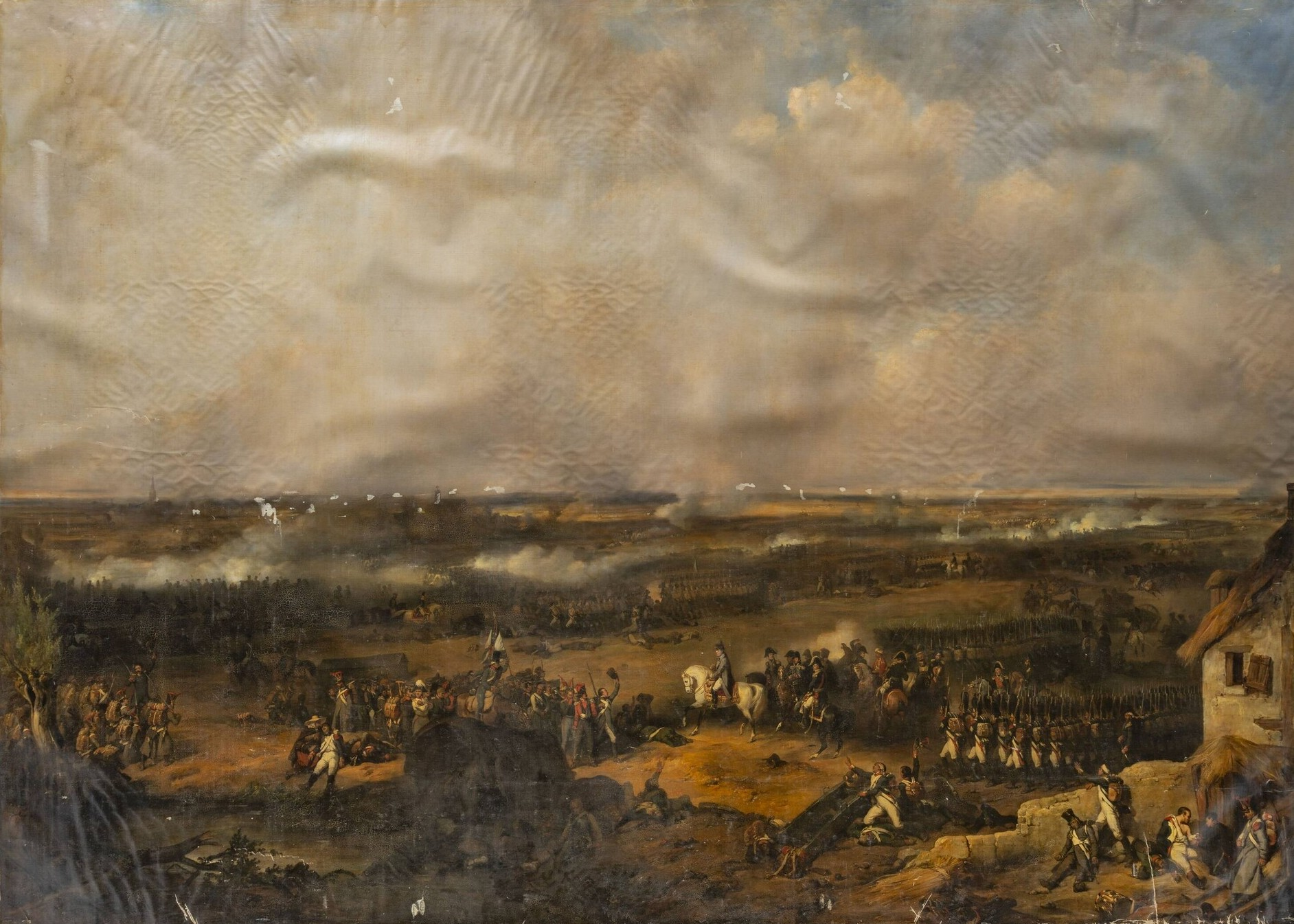
- Battle of Lützen, 2 May 1813 by Joseph Beaume, 1836–1837
Date	2 May 1813
Location	Lützen, Germany 51°13′00″N 12°11′00″E
Result	French victory

Belligerents
France; Italy; Hesse	Russia; Prussia

Commanders and leaders
(First French Empire) Napoleon I; (First French Empire) Michel Ney; (First French Empire) Jean-de-Dieu Soult; (First French Empire) Auguste de Marmont; (First French Empire) Édouard Mortier; (First French Empire) Henri Gatien Bertrand; (First French Empire) Jacques MacDonald; (First French Empire) Eugène de Beauharnais; (First French Empire) Nicolas Oudinot; (First French Empire) Géraud Duroc; (First French Empire) Jean-Baptiste Bessières †; (First French Empire) Horace Sébastiani; (First French Empire) Jacques Lauriston	(Russian Empire) Alexander I; (Russian Empire) Peter Wittgenstein; (Russian Empire) Alexander Tormasov; (Russian Empire) Ferdinand von Wintzingerode; (Russian Empire) Levin August von Bennigsen; (Kingdom of Prussia) Gebhard Leberecht von Blücher; (Kingdom of Prussia) Ludwig Yorck von Wartenburg; (Kingdom of Prussia) Gerhard von Scharnhorst (DOW); (Kingdom of Prussia) Frederick William III

Strength
78,000–145,000; 372 guns	70,000–96,000; 552 guns

Casualties and losses
19,655–22,000	11,500–30,000
- Location within Europe

War of the Sixth Coalition:
German campaign
current battle
Napoleon in command
Napoleon not in command

The Battle of Lützen, fought on 2 May 1813 near the town of Lützen in Saxony, was a major engagement during the War of the Sixth Coalition. It pitted Napoleon Bonaparte's French forces against a coalition army of Prussian and Russian troops commanded by Generals Wittgenstein and Blücher. The battle marked Napoleon's attempt to reassert dominance in Central Europe following his disastrous retreat from Russia in 1812. Although the Allies initially gained ground and inflicted significant damage on the French forces, Napoleon's tactical brilliance and use of concentrated reserves allowed him to turn the tide of the battle. The French ultimately secured a costly victory, forcing the Allies to retreat.

== Background ==
Following the disaster of French invasion of Russia in 1812, the European powers saw their chance of ridding themselves of Napoleon. After Prussia had declared itself neutral following Napoleon's retreat from Russia, it secretly signed a treaty of alliance with Russia on 27 February. On 6 March, Berlin officially dissolved the alliance with Napoleon and one day later Frederick William III declared war on France. Throughout March and April 1813, the French troops in Germany under Marshal Eugène de Beauharnais engaged in a series of skirmishes and retreats as they attempted to regroup and consolidate their positions. The coalition forces, led by Russian General Wittgenstein and Prussian General Blücher, sought to exploit French disorganization and drive them out of Saxony, a strategically vital region that served as the gateway to Central Europe. Meanwhile, Napoleon, aware of the fragile state of his forces in Germany, worked feverishly to rebuild his army. In France, he implemented mass conscription, raising a new army of approximately 200,000 men, though the recruits were largely inexperienced and lacked the battle-hardened discipline of the veterans lost in Russia. By late March, these reinforcements began arriving in Germany to bolster the remnants of the French forces, which were under pressure from advancing coalition armies.

== Prelude ==
Napoleon, having at length completed his preparations, quitted Mayence on the 26th of April, and visiting successively Wurzburg and Fulda, proceeded to Weimar, where Marshal Ney had preceded him with his fresh divisions. His plan was to pass back over the Elbe and march on Berlin to throw the Allies back between the Elbe and the Saale, and to establish the front between the Elbe and the Oder, moving under the protection of the fortresses of Torgau, Wittenberg, Magdeburg and Hamburg. If circumstances permitted, he would then relieve the fortresses besieged on the Vistula: Danzig, Thorn and Modlin. He had sent Marshal Ney to occupy the passages of the Saale before the enemy had time to seize them, but directed him only to guard and not to cross the Saale. He also had directed General Bertrand, followed at a short distance by Marshal Oudinot to meet him at Saalfeld. At the same time he ordered Prince Eugene to advance en masse in the direction of Dessau, at no great distance from the confluence of the Saale and the Elbe, and to ascend the course of the Saale as far as Weissenfels.

On 30 April, Napoleon had crossed the river Saale, proceeding to Weisenfels. Napoleon had however not completed the concentration of his army for the XII corps and the Wurtemberg division were still two days' march off. Thus he only could muster 145,000 men. Having established his connection with Prince Eugene on the Lower Saale, he was set on deploying his forces en masse on the plains of Lützen, marching towards Leipzig, crossing the river there, and then executing an operational manoeuvre. His left wing would advance, crushing the Allies in the Bohemian mountains. But due to the lack of cavalrymen and faulty reconnaissance, he was unaware of the Russo-Prussian army under Wittgenstein and Graf (Count) von Blücher. He believed them to be scattered from Dessau to Zwickau, with their main body about Altenburg.

From mid-April, the Allied army faced growing uncertainty about French movements. Although front-line generals suspected French activity as early as mid-March, the Tsar's advisors believed no major action would occur before June. Generals Blücher and Wittgenstein, unconvinced by this cautious outlook, cautiously advanced Allied forces westward toward the Saale River. Anticipating being outnumbered by Napoleon's forces, they debated two possible strategies: retreating behind the Elbe River or concentrating their forces to attack Napoleon's army as it crossed the Saale. Retreat was deemed unwise, as the French already controlled key Elbe bridgeheads at Magdeburg and Wittenberg, and such a move risked damaging Allied morale. Instead, the Allies chose the bolder option, relying on their cavalry superiority and the skill of Russian veterans to counter Napoleon's less experienced conscripts. This approach was endorsed by Allied leadership, and between April 19 and 24, Russian reinforcements, including Miloradovich's corps and the Russian Guard, moved to the front near Dresden, accompanied by the Tsar and the King of Prussia. When Marshal Kutuzov was gravely ill, the Tsar appointed Wittgenstein as commander-in-chief, a decision supported by the Prussians. (Note: However, senior Russian generals Tormasov and Miloradovich objected, asserting their rank over Wittgenstein. To avoid conflict, the Tsar reached a compromise: Wittgenstein commanded Blücher and Winzingerode, while the Tsar retained direct control of Tormasov and Miloradovich.) At the same time reports of clashes with French forces at Merseburg, Halle, and Weissenfels, signalling Napoleon's advance. The Allies quickly concentrated their forces—48,000 infantry, 25,000 cavalry, and over 500 guns—between Leipzig and Altenburg, preparing to strike Napoleon's right flank near Lützen if he continued crossing the Saale.

Napoleon planned an advance from Weissenfels to Lützen, followed by a march toward Leipzig in a compact formation, with the ultimate goal of crossing the Lister. Recognizing that his army could not advance simultaneously along a single road, he divided his forces into multiple columns to ensure coordination and flanking support. Marshal Ney, along with the Imperial Guard and Marshal Marmont, was directed to take the main route from Lützen to Leipzig. To secure the right flank, General Bertrand and Marshal Oudinot were ordered to move from Naumburg toward Stössen. Meanwhile, Prince Eugene was instructed to lead his forces from Merseburg along the Mackranstädt route to Leipzig, providing coverage on the left flank.

In the evening of the 1st May the French had attained the following positions: Marshal Ney's III Corps was to hold the right flank around Lützen in support of the forces marching towards Leipzig and was caught by surprise. The III Corps consisted of five infantry divisions and a cavalry brigade. Three of these divisions were situated around Lützen, one division in the four villages to the southeast (Kaja, Kleingörschen, Großgörschen and Rahna) and one division a mile (~1.6 km) to the west of these in Starsiedel. The French VI Corps under Marshal Marmont was at Rippach to the west, Bertrand's IV Corps was south of Weissenfels (Weißenfels) where the Imperial Guard was also located. Macdonald's XI Corps and the I Cavalry Corps were situated to the north of Lützen.

At Allied headquarters, Wittgenstein assumed that Napoleon's corps were spread out in a long column marching from Weissenfels by Lützen to Leipzig, and that his right flank was guarded only by a weak detachment at Kaja. Wittgenstein's plan was to attack by surprise this long column on its right flank, to destroy the detachment at Kaja, to advance thence on Lützen, breaking Napoleon's line, and driving all that had passed Lützen northwards of their line of operations on to the marshes of the Elster below Leipzig.

Wittgenstein's orders for the 2nd May were as follows:

Blücher was to reach the Elster by 05.00 hours in two columns, the right at Storkwitz, due east of Werben, the left at Karsdorf, just north of Pegau. By 06.00 hours his right column was to be across the Flossgraben, near Werben, his left having already crossed half an hour earlier. Yorck and Berg were to follow respectively Blücher's left and right columns. (Note: The Russian heavy artillery was attached to Blücher) Wintzingerode was to leave three battalions and a company of light artillery to guard the defile of Zwenkau, and to watch the Elster between that place and Leipzig. The rest of his corps was to cover Blücher's right. The Russian Guard was to be at 07.00 hours at Pegau and Storkwitz, as reserve, holding the defiles at Stontzsch, Karsdorf, and Storkwitz.

After crossing the Flossgraben, Blücher was to bear leftwards in first line, seeking, as soon as possible, to gain with his left the insignificant Grüna brook which flows from Gross Grimma to Dehlitz, and sending cavalry and artillery to hold the heights beyond the brook. His right was to be kept refused on the Flossgraben, and an advance was to be made with the left leading, between the Rippach stream and the Flossgraben. The second line to follow the first. Kleist, at Lindenau and Leipzig, was only to act when he heard the main body of the army engaged far to his left. If he found himself attacked by very superior forces, he would retreat through Leipzig on Wurzen. Miloradovich was to advance towards Zeitz. In the event of an attack in force by the enemy from Weissenfels on Blücher's left, the Russian Guard would move to the left from Stontzsch, and attack the French right. The aim was to reach the enemy's right flank.

== Battle ==
The Prussian attack started off late with Blücher leading with his corps about 11:30. As they approached Großgörschen, he was only expecting a couple thousand French instead of the full division that he found. Blücher paused the attack, called up his artillery and started an artillery bombardment. This delay gave General Souham just enough time to occupy Gross Görschen while General Girard proceeded to gather his men around the village of Starsiedl, waiting for Marmont to arrive. At noon, General Souham secured Gross Görschen, while General Girard rallied his forces around Starsiedl, awaiting the arrival of Marmont. The general engagement commenced shortly thereafter. Girard managed to hold his position, but Souham was forced to retreat under heavy artillery fire. At this critical juncture, Marshal Ney, covered in dust, arrived. His arrival enabled Girard to leave the defence of Starsiedel to him, and to march to the aid of Souham.

Napoleon was taken by surprise at the intensity of cannon fire coming from the direction of Lützen. Having reached Markranstädt with Lauriston's V Corps, he became aware of the unfolding events on his right flank. After carefully listening to the distant battle, he issued decisive orders: the III Corps was to hold its ground at all costs while Marmont moved to support its right and Bertrand threatened the Russian left. Simultaneously, Macdonald was to redirect his XI Corps southward from the Leipzig road to attack the Russian right. Lauriston, leaving one division to deal with General Kleist (who was evacuating Leipzig by 13:00), was to counter-march his remaining forces toward Markranstädt. The Imperial Guard was ordered to move immediately to the Kaja area.

Napoleon reached the battlefield at 14:30 and found the situation critical. Ney's corps, exhausted and shaken, was on the verge of collapse. Bertrand had halted his advance against Blücher's left upon discovering Miloradovich advancing toward Zeitz. Marmont, meanwhile, was under heavy pressure from the Allies. The moment called for direct intervention, and Napoleon rose to the occasion. Riding among the disordered conscripts, he personally rallied his troops, exhorting them back into formation and repeatedly leading them in charges against the enemy. His presence revitalized the army, instilling confidence and determination. Marmont later wrote, "This was probably the day, of his whole career, on which Napoleon incurred the greatest personal danger on the field of battle. He exposed himself constantly, leading the defeated men of III Corps back to the charge." Despite these efforts, the situation remained dire. Ney and Marmont's forces were in poor condition, and urgent appeals for reinforcements poured in from all sides. Although the Guard arrived at Kaja shortly after Napoleon, he refused to commit them prematurely, stating, "The battle turns about Kaja." The fighting along the ridge swung back and forth, but the delay allowed Bertrand and Macdonald to close in on the flanks of Wittgenstein's army.

A series of misfortunes and errors hindered the Allies. Blücher was wounded, and command passed to General Yorck, a less inspiring leader. The Russian reserves were slow to arrive, and Wittgenstein hesitated to commit Yorck's corps without their support. Tsar Alexander, mistakenly believing the battle to be progressing favorably, held back Tormasov's Guards and grenadiers, intending to lead them personally in a decisive final assault. This delay left Wittgenstein increasingly vulnerable, yet he felt too committed to withdraw. At 16:00, the Russian reserves finally arrived, and Yorck launched a new assault. The Prussians advanced close to Kaja, but a counterattack by the Young Guard, supported by III Corps, restored the French line. The struggle for the villages and the ridge resumed its previous intensity.

By 17:30, Napoleon's outflanking maneuvers were nearly complete. Macdonald captured Eisdorf on Ney's left, while Bertrand linked up with Marmont's right. Although the Allies regained two villages in the center, Napoleon's forces were now concentrated, giving them a significant numerical advantage. At 18:00, Napoleon initiated a grand attack. General Drouot deployed 70 cannons southwest of Kaja, advancing them to almost point-blank range. The Young Guard formed into four assault columns of four battalions each, supported by the Old Guard, Guard Cavalry, and remnants of III Corps. Marmont and Bertrand attacked from the right, while Macdonald advanced from the left. The order was given: “La Garde au feu.” In a series of overwhelming assaults, the villages of Rahna, Klein Görschen, and Gross Görschen were retaken. The Allied line began to collapse into confusion. Napoleon required only two more hours of daylight to secure a decisive victory. However, nightfall soon descended, bringing the battle to an inconclusive end.

Napoleon lost 19,655 men, including 2,757 killed and 16,898 wounded, including one of his marshals, while the Prussians lost at least 8,500 men killed or wounded and the Russians lost 3,500 men killed, wounded or missing, although casualties may have been much higher. By nightfall, the Tsar and Wittgenstein were hardly convinced that they had lost the battle. They retreated, however, after hearing that Leipzig had fallen, leaving Napoleon in control of Lützen and the field.

== Aftermath ==
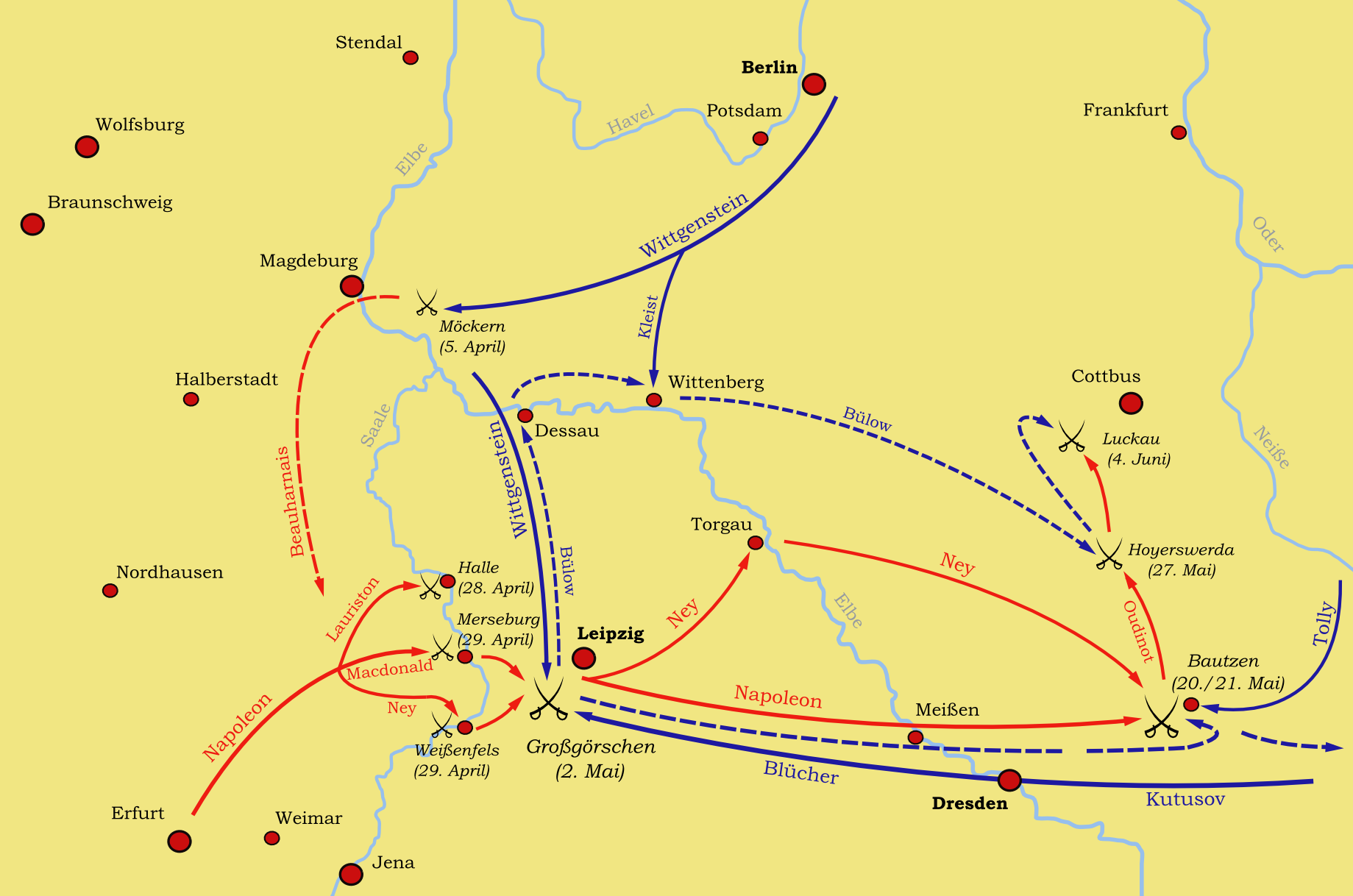
Army movements in the Spring Campaign of 1813

Napoleon demonstrated his usual prowess in driving back the Russo-Prussian force at Lützen, but the costliness of his victory had a major impact on the war. Lützen was followed by the Battle of Bautzen eighteen days later, where Napoleon was again victorious but with the loss of another 22,000 men, twice as many as the Russo-Prussian army. The ferocity of these two battles prompted Napoleon to accept a temporary armistice on June 4 with Tsar Alexander and King Frederick William III. This agreement provided the allies the respite to organise and re-equip their armies and, perhaps more importantly, encouraged Britain to provide Russia and Prussia with war subsidies totalling seven million pounds. The financial security offered by this agreement was a major boon to the war effort against Napoleon. Another important result of the battle was that it encouraged Austria to join the allied Coalition upon the armistice's expiration, shifting the balance of power dramatically in the Coalition's favor. Due to these developments, Napoleon later regarded the June 4 truce, bought at Lützen and Bautzen, as the undoing of his power in Germany.

During the battle of Lützen, Gerhard von Scharnhorst, one of the brightest and most able Prussian generals, was wounded while serving as Wittgenstein's Chief of Staff. Although his wound was minor, the hasty retreat prevented proper treatment, allowing a fatal infection to set in.

== Bibliography ==
- Abbott, John S. C. (1883). The history of Napoleon Bonaparte. Vol. III. New York: Harper & brothers. This article incorporates text from this source, which is in the public domain.
- Bodart, Gaston (1908). Militär-historisches Kriegs-Lexikon (1618–1905) (in German). Vienna: Stern. OCLC 230729343. This article incorporates text from this source, which is in the public domain.
- Chandler, David G. (2009). The Campaigns of Napoleon. The mind and method of history's greatest soldier. New York: Simon and Schuster. ISBN 0-02-523660-1.
- Castelot, André (1971). Napoleon. New York: Harper & Row. ISBN 0060106786.
- Clark, Christopher C. (2006). Iron Kingdom: The Rise and Downfall of Prussia, 1600–1947. Cambridge, Massachusetts: Belknap Press of Harvard University Press. ISBN 978-0-674-02385-7.
- Dupuy, R. Ernest; Dupuy, Trevor N. (1986). The Encyclopedia of Military History: From 3500 B.C. to the Present (2nd ed.). Harper & Row Publishers. ISBN 0061812358.
- Leggiere, Michael V. (2015). Napoleon and the Struggle for Germany. Vol. 1. Cambridge University Press. ISBN 978-1107080515.
- Petre, Francis Loraine (1912). Napoleon's Last Campaign in Germany in 1813. London: Lane. This article incorporates text from this source, which is in the public domain.
- Pigeard, Alain (2004). Dictionnaire des batailles de Napoléon (in French). Editions Tallandier. ISBN 2847340734.
- Smith, Digby (1998). The Napoleonic Wars Data Book. Greenhill. ISBN 1853672769.
- Thiers, Adolphe (1894). History of the Consulate and the Empire of France under Napoleon. Vol. 8. Philadelphia: J.B. Lippincott. This article incorporates text from this source, which is in the public domain.
- Tulard, Jean (1999). I-Z. Dictionnaire Napoléon. Vol. II. Paris: Fayard. ISBN 2-213-60485-1.

Preceded by Battle of Castalla	Napoleonic Wars; Battle of Lützen (1813)	Succeeded by Battle of Bautzen (1813)
