= Henry Hexham =

English military writer

Henry Hexham (c. 1585 – c. 1650) was an English military writer. He also worked on Mercator's Atlas and on a Copious English and Nether-duytch Dictionarie.

== Life ==
Hexham was born in Holland, Lincolnshire. His mother appears to have been a sister of Jerome Heydon, merchant, of London, who was probably related to Sir Christopher Heydon. The cousin, John Heydon, to whom Hexham dedicates his Appendix of Lawes, has been identified with Sir John Heydon (died 1653), Sir Christopher's son, and Sir Christopher's daughter Frances married Philip Vincent, who has commendatory verses prefixed to Hexham's translation of Mercator's Atlas.

Hexham was placed as a page in his early youth to Sir Francis Vere, with whom he remained through the siege of Ostend in 1601. His narrative of it appears at the end of Sir Francis Vere's Commentaries (1657). Hexham seems to have served Sir Francis until his return to England in 1606, then remained in the Low Countries, possibly in a town garrisoned by the English. He was personally acquainted with Prince Maurice of Nassau and his brother, Frederick Henry. In 1611 he published a Dutch translation of The Highway to Heaven, by Thomas Tuke entitled De Konincklicke wech tot den Hemel... (Dordrecht). In 1623 came A Tongue Combat lately happening between two English Souldiers... the one going to serve the King of Spain, the other to serve the States Generall (London, 1623). When Sir Horace Vere in 1625 went to relieve Breda, Hexham was quartermaster to his regiment. He held similar positions under Vere during the siege of 's-Hertogenbosch in 1629, and the capture of Venlo, Roermond and Strale, and siege of Maastricht in 1631–1632.

After Vere's death, Hexham became quartermaster to the regiment of George Goring, with whom he served at the siege of Breda in 1637. In 1640 he was in England, and on 27 July received a pass on going to Holland on private business. On 23 July 1641, Edward Conway, 2nd Viscount Conway wrote to Secretary Edward Nicholas that he had known Hexham as long as he could remember and was sure he was a good Protestant, who would take the oath of allegiance and supremacy, as he did four days later. Hexham, however, took no part in the civil wars in England. He returned to Holland before 1642 and stayed there in Dutch service and busy with literary work. His English-Dutch Dictionary has a preface dated Rotterdam, 21 September 1647. He probably died about 1650.

== Works ==
Hexham's major work is an edition of Mercator's Atlas, which translates into English the edition by Jodocus Hondius, with Hexham making some additions of his own. He was assisted by Hondius's son Henry. The preface is dated Amsterdam, 1 January 1636 stilo veteri (old style) and dedicated to Charles I. Published in two volumes in Amsterdam in 1636–1637, it contains many maps and coloured plates and counts as the standard Mercator edition. Another important work was his Copious English and Nether-duytch Dictionarie … as also a compendious grammar for the instruction of the learner. The English-Dutch part appeared in Rotterdam in 1648. dedicated to Hexham's friend Sir Bartholomew van Vouw, knight. The Dutch-English part appeared only in 1658, in Rotterdam. Hexham's undated preface claims his is the first dictionary of its kind. Second editions were published by Daniel Manly, the Dutch-English in 1672 and the English-Dutch in 1675, both in Rotterdam.

Hexham's other works relate to military history, dealing with events in which he himself took part. They are:

- A Historicall Relation of the Famous Siege of the Busse and the Surprising of Wesell..., Delft, 1630, dedicated to the Delft merchants adventurers; a Dutch edition appeared the same year.
- A Journall of the taking of Venlo, Roermont, Strale, the memorable Siege of Mastricht, the towne and castle of Limbruch... anno 1632, Delft, 1633, dedicated to his kinsman Francis Morrice, Clerk of the King's Ordnance, who had married his uncle Jerome Heydon's widow; a Dutch edition was published in The Hague in 1633.
- The Principles of the Art Militarie practised in the Warres of the United Netherlands, London, 1637; dedicated on 5 September 1637 to Henry Rich, 1st Earl of Holland. A second, enlarged edition followed in three parts: the first two at Delft in 1642 and the third at Rotterdam in 1643. Concurrent Dutch editions were dedicated to William of Orange and Charles I Louis, Elector Palatine.
- A True and Briefe Relation of the famous Siege of Breda, Delft, 1637, dedicated to the Earl of Holland; a Dutch edition was published at The Hague in 1638.
- An Appendix of the Quarter for the ransoming of Officers... together with the Lawes and Articles of Marshall discipline enacted on the States side, Delft, 1637; a further edition in The Hague, 1643
- The Art of Fortification... by Samvell Marolois... augmented by Albert Girard... and translated by Henry Hexham, Amsterdam, 1638; translated from Samuel Marolois, it is dedicated to Henry Vane the elder.
- A True Relation of the Battell of Nieupoort, Delft, 1641
- An Appendix of Lawes, Articles, and Ordinances established for Marshall Discipline in the service of the... States Generall... translated out of Dutch into English, The Hague, 1643; dedicated to Hexham's cousins John Heydon and John Harvey. In the preface, dated Delft, 30 January 1643 stilo novo (new style), Hexham says he wishes to prevent the pillage committed on both sides during the civil wars by showing the means taken by the Dutch to check it. He also remarks that he had served 42 years in the wars and never been wounded.
