= Starsiedel =

- Stadtteil of Lützen
- Interactive map of Starsiedel
- Location within Germany Location within Saxony-Anhalt
- Coordinates: 51°13′3″N 12°8′25″E
- Country: Germany
- State: Saxony-Anhalt
- District: Burgenlandkreis
- Town: Lützen

Area
  - Total: 5.77 km^{2} (2.23 sq mi)
- Elevation: 140 m (460 ft)

Population (2006-12-31)
  - Total: 692
  - Density: 120/km^{2} (311/sq mi)
- Time zone: UTC+01:00 (CET)
  - Summer (DST): UTC+02:00 (CEST)
- Postal codes: 06686
- Dialling codes: 034444
- Vehicle registration: BLK
- Website: www.starsiedel.de

Starsiedel is a village and a former municipality in the Burgenlandkreis district, in Saxony-Anhalt, Germany.

Since 1 January 2010, it is part of the town Lützen.
