= Thomas Tuke (writer) =

English clergyman and writer

Thomas Tuke (c.1580–1657) was an English clergyman and controversial writer, of royalist views in later life.

== Life ==
He was educated at Christ's College, Cambridge, where he proceeded B.A. in 1599 and commenced M.A. in 1603. He was minister at St. Giles's-in-the-Fields, London, in 1616. On 19 July 1617 he was presented by James I to the vicarage of St. Olave Jewry, and he held that living till 16 March 1642–3, when he was sequestered, plundered, and imprisoned for his adherence to the royalist cause .

In 1651 he was preaching at Tattershall, Lincolnshire. Richard Smyth, in his ‘Obituary’, notes that on 13 September 1657 ‘old Mr. Thomas Tuke, once minister at St. Olave's in the Old Jury, was buried at ye new chapell by the new markett place in Lincoln's Inn Fields.’ His wife Mary was buried at St. Olave's on 17 June 1654.

== Works ==
Among his works are:

- A translation made with Francis Cacot of William Perkins's ‘Christian and Plaine Treatise of … Predestination,’ London, 1606.
- ‘The True Trial and Turning of a Sinner,’ London, 1607.
- ‘The Treasure of True Love. Or a lively description of the love of Christ unto his Spouse,’ London, 1608.
- ‘The Highway to Heaven; or the doctrine of Election, effectuall Vocation, Iustification, Sanctification, and eternall Life,’ London, 1609. A Dutch translation by Henry Hexham was published at Dordrecht, 1611.
- ‘The Picture of a true Protestant; or, Gods House and Husbandry: wherein is declared the duty and dignitie of all Gods children, both Ministers and People,’ London, 1609.
- ‘A very Christian, learned and briefe Discourse, concerning the true, ancient, and Catholicke Faith,’ London, 1611, translated from the Latin of Vincent de Lérins.
- ‘A Discourse of Death, bodily, ghostly, and eternall: nor unfit for Souldiers warring, Seamen sayling, Strangers travelling, Women bearing, nor any other living that thinkes of Dying,’ London, 1613.
- ‘The Practice of the Faithful; containing many godly praiers,’ London, 1613.
- ‘New Essayes: Meditations and Vowes: including in them the Chiefe Duties of a Christian both for Faith and Manners,’ London, 1614.
- ‘The Christians Looking-Glass,’ London, 1615.
- ‘A Treatise against paint[i]ng and tincturing of Men and Women: against Murther and Poysoning: against Pride and Ambition: against Adulterie and Witchcraft, and the roote of all these, Disobedience to the Ministrie of the Word. Whereunto is added the Picture of a Picture, or the Character of a Painted Woman,’ London, 1616. The ‘Picture of a Picture’ was originally printed as a broadside.

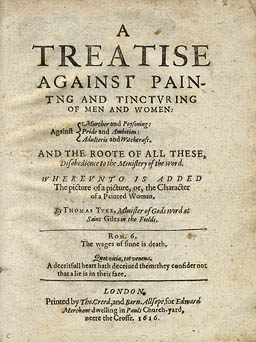
Title page from 1616 from A Treatise against painting and tincturing of Men and Women.

- ‘Index Fidei et Religionis, sive Dilucidatio primi & secundi capitis Epistolæ Catholicæ Divi Jacobi,’ London [1617].
- ‘A Theological Discourse of the gracious and blessed conjunction of Christ and a sincere Christian,’ London, 1617,.
- ‘Concerning the Holy Eucharist, and the Popish Breaden-God, to the men of Rome, as well laiques as cleriques’ [in verse, London], 1625; 2nd edit. 1636; reprinted for private circulation in the ‘Miscellanies of the Fuller Worthies' Library,’ 1872, with an introduction and notes by Alexander Grosart.
- ‘The Israelites Promise or Profession made to Joshua,’ London, 1651.

== Notes ==
Attribution

This article incorporates text from a publication now in the public domain: "Tuke, Thomas". Dictionary of National Biography. London: Smith, Elder & Co. 1885–1900.
