= Poserna =

- Stadtteil of Lützen
- Interactive map of Poserna
- Location within Germany Location within Saxony-Anhalt
- Coordinates: 51°12′47″N 12°4′59″E
- Country: Germany
- State: Saxony-Anhalt
- District: Burgenlandkreis
- Town: Lützen

Area
  - Total: 5.06 km^{2} (1.95 sq mi)
- Elevation: 115 m (377 ft)

Population (2006-12-31)
  - Total: 384
  - Density: 75.9/km^{2} (197/sq mi)
- Time zone: UTC+01:00 (CET)
  - Summer (DST): UTC+02:00 (CEST)
- Postal codes: 06686
- Dialling codes: 03443
- Vehicle registration: BLK

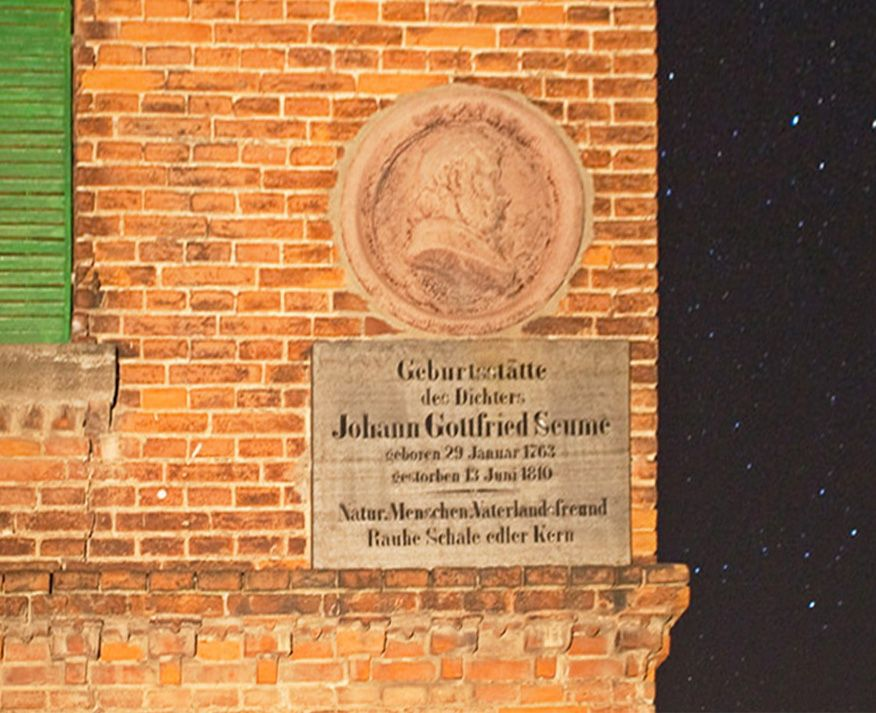
Seume House with commemorative plaque at Poserna

Poserna is a village and a former municipality in the Burgenlandkreis district, in Saxony-Anhalt, Germany.

Since 1 January 2010, it is part of the town Lützen.
