= Sössen =

- Ortsteil of Lützen
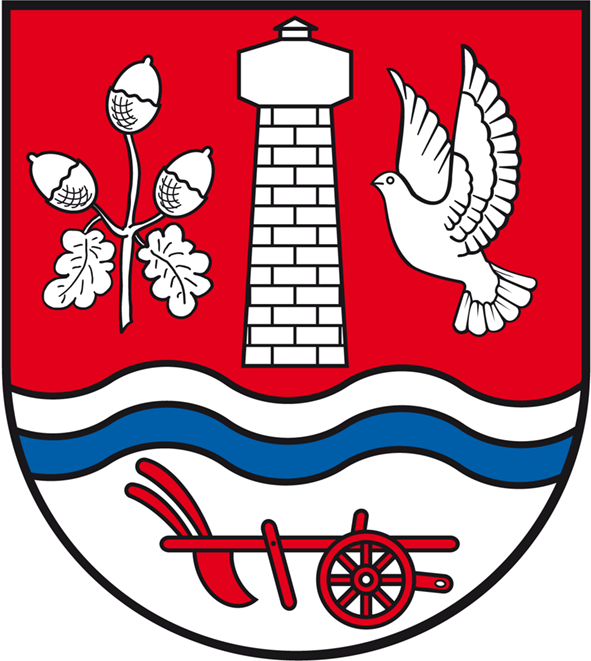
- Coat of arms
- Interactive map of Sössen
- Location within Germany Location within Saxony-Anhalt
- Coordinates: 51°13′N 12°6′E
- Country: Germany
- State: Saxony-Anhalt
- District: Burgenlandkreis
- Town: Lützen

Area
  - Total: 3.41 km^{2} (1.32 sq mi)
- Elevation: 129 m (423 ft)

Population (2009-12-31)
  - Total: 226
  - Density: 66.3/km^{2} (172/sq mi)
- Time zone: UTC+01:00 (CET)
  - Summer (DST): UTC+02:00 (CEST)
- Postal codes: 06686
- Dialling codes: 034444
- Vehicle registration: BLK

Sössen is a village and a former municipality in the Burgenlandkreis district, in Saxony-Anhalt, Germany. Since 1 January 2011, it is part of the town Lützen.
