= Johann Gottfried Seume =

German author (1763–1810)

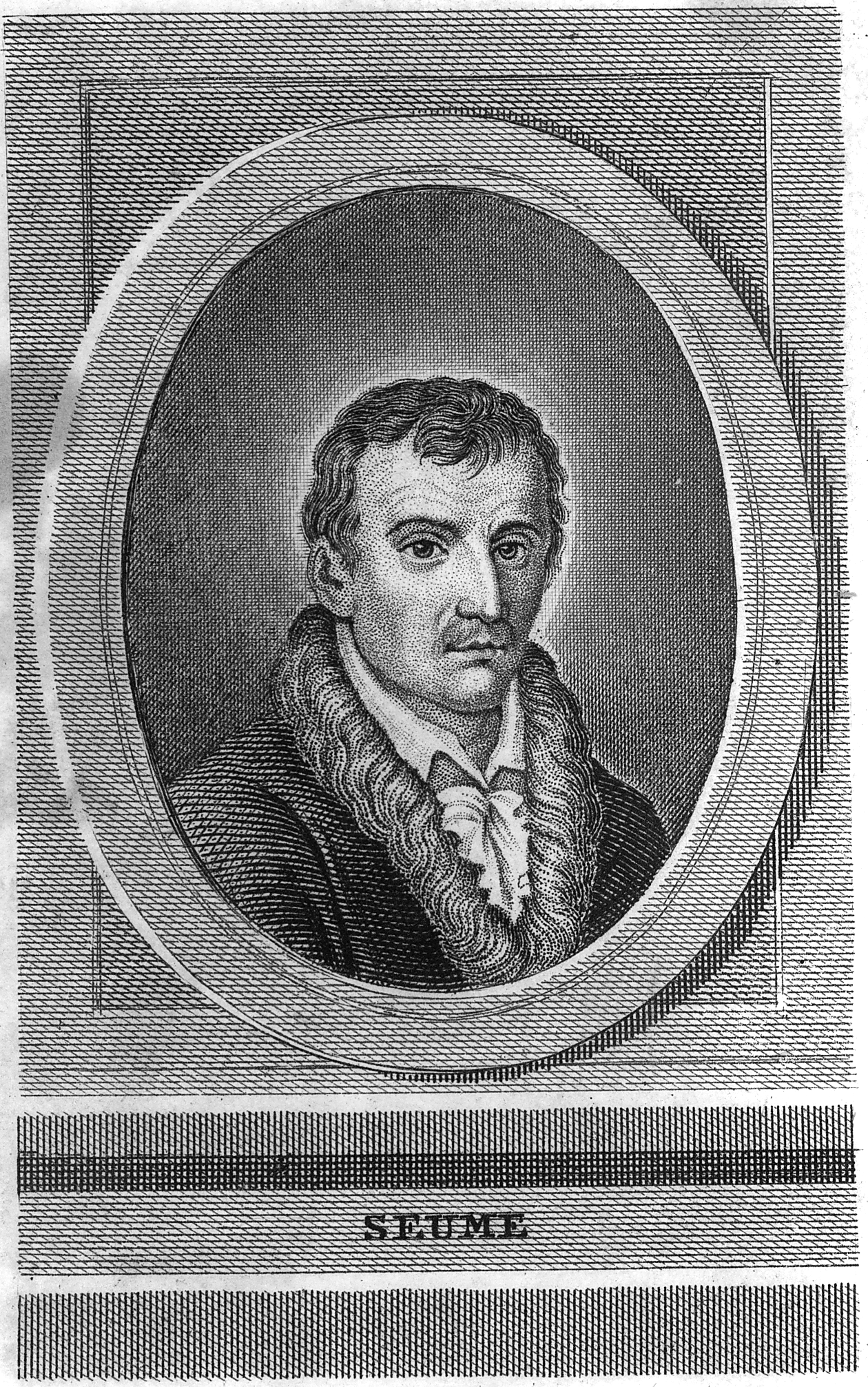
Portrait of Johann Gottfried Seume

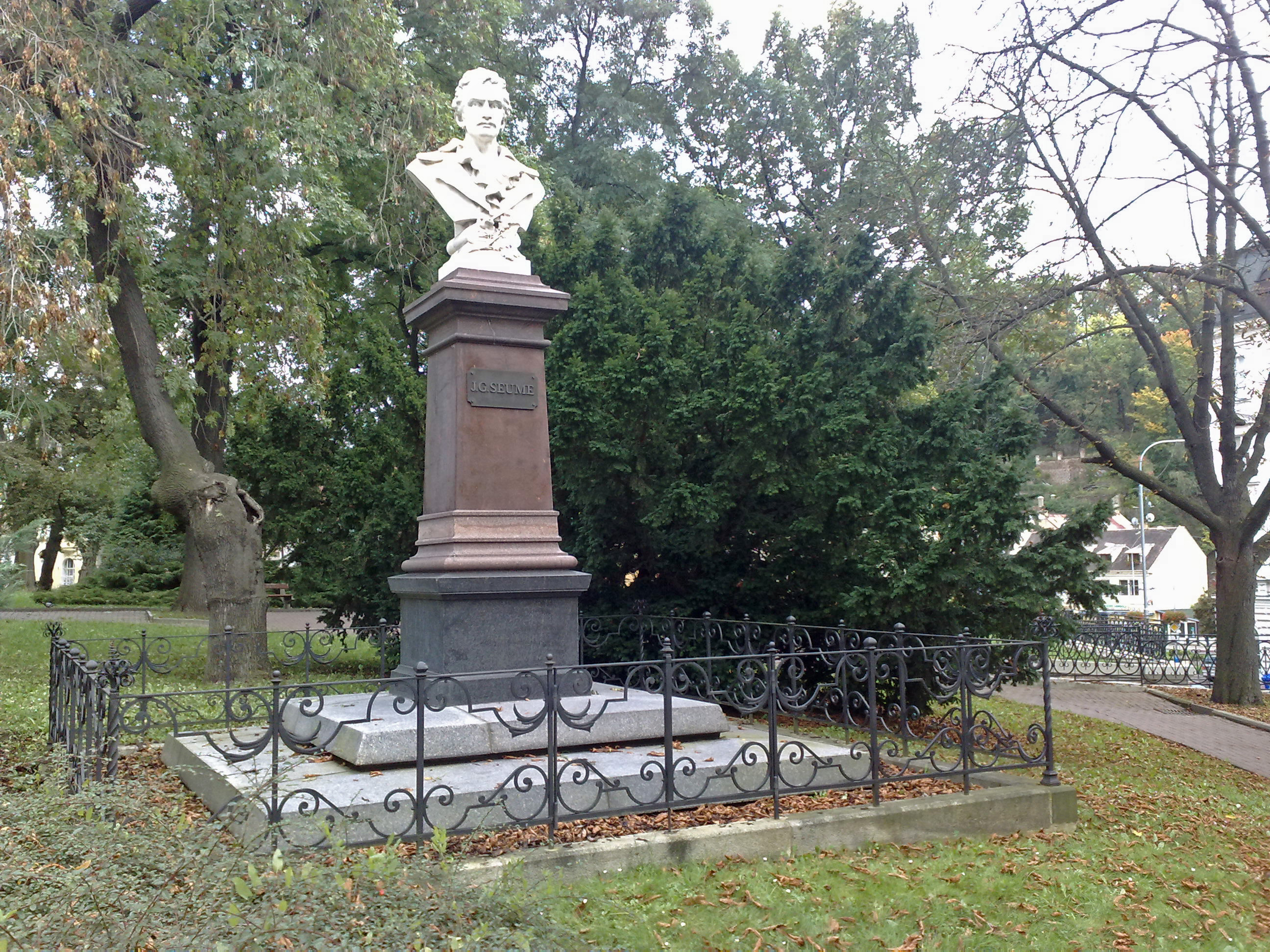
Memorial in Teplice

Johann Gottfried Seume (29 January 1763 – 13 June 1810) was a German writer.

== Biography ==
Seume was born in Poserna (now part of Lützen, Saxony-Anhalt). He was educated first at Borna, then at the St Nicholas School (Nikolaischule) and University of Leipzig. The study of Shaftesbury and Bolingbroke wakened his interest in theology, and, breaking off his studies, he travelled to Hesse-Kassel to join the military. Seume later wrote that he was traveling to study in Paris when he was seized by Hessian recruiting officers and sold to England, whereupon he was drafted to Canada. (Multiple historians dispute this account, suggesting Seume voluntarily enlisted.)

After his return in 1783 he deserted at Bremen, but was captured and brought to Emden; a second attempt at flight also failed. In 1787, however, a citizen of Emden became surety for him to the amount of 80 talers, and he was allowed to visit his home. He did not return, but paid off his debt in Emden with the remuneration he received for translating an English novel.

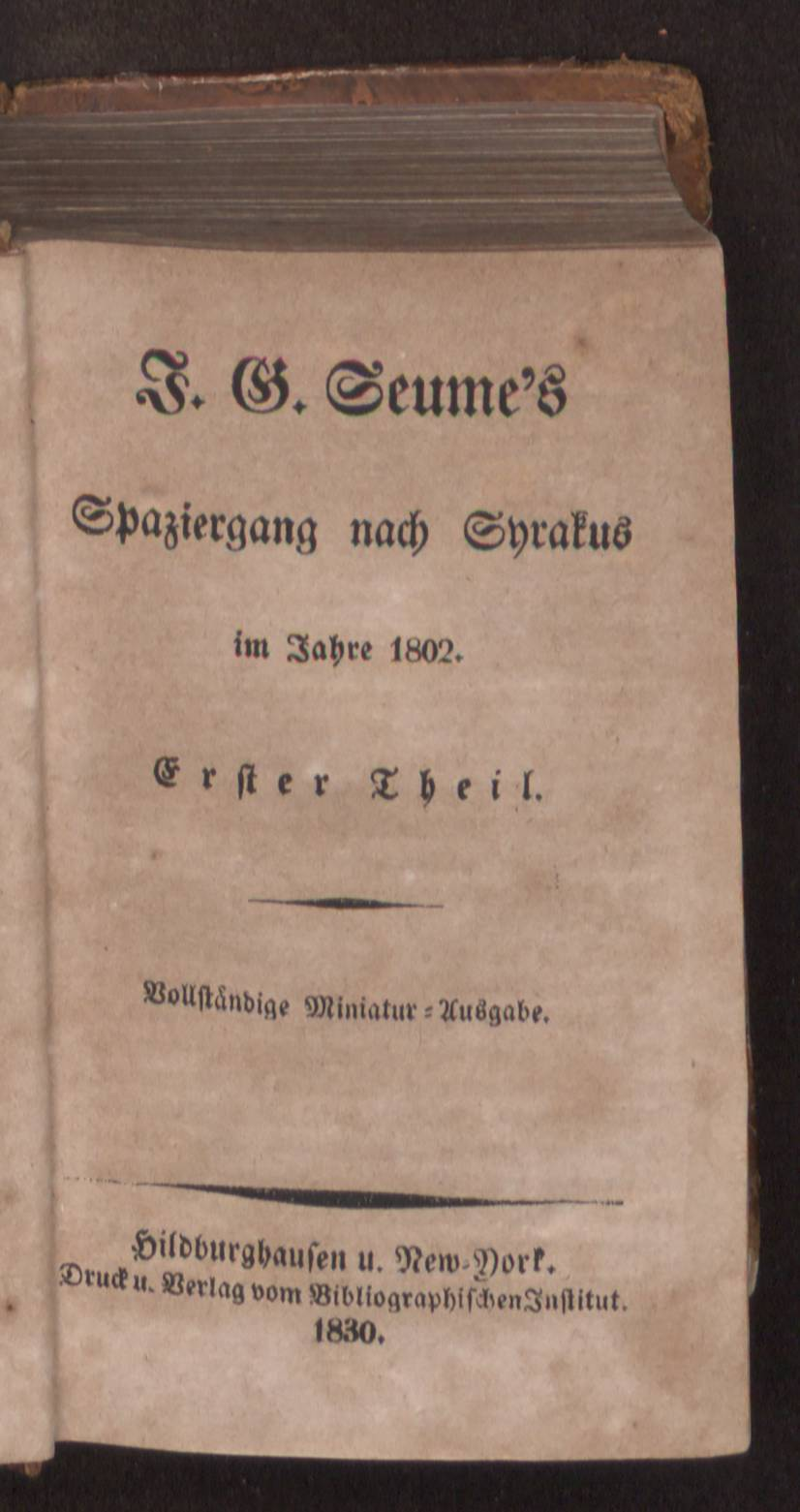
Spaziergang nach Syrakus im Jahre 1802, 1830-1841

He taught languages for a time in Leipzig, and became tutor to a Graf Igelstrom, whom, in 1792, he accompanied to Warsaw. Here he became secretary to General von Igelstrom, and, as a Russian officer, experienced the terrors of the Polish insurrection (Kościuszko Uprising). In 1796 he was again in Leipzig and, resigning his Russian commission, entered the employment of the publisher Georg Joachim Göschen.

In December 1801, he set out on his famous nine months' walk to Sicily, described in his Spaziergang nach Syrakus (1803). Some years later he visited Russia, Finland, Sweden and Denmark, a journey which is described in Mein Sommer im Jahr 1805 (1807). His health now began to fail, and he died on 13 June 1810, in Teplitz (now also known as Teplice).

His reputation rests on the two books just mentioned, to which may be added his autobiography, Mein Leben (1813, continued by Christian August Heinrich Clodius). As a dramatist (Miltiades, 1808), and as a lyric poet (Gedichte, 1801), he had but little success.

Seume's Gesammelte Schriften were first edited by J. P. Zimmermann (1823–1826); his Sämtliche Werke (1826–1827) passed through seven editions. The most recent edition as of 1911 was J. G. Seume's Prosaische und poetische Werke (10 volumes, 1879). See Oskar Planer and Camillo Reißmann, J. G. Seume. Geschichte seines Lebens und seiner Schriften (1898).

== Seume and Beethoven ==
Seume died in Teplitz in June 1810. Ludwig van Beethoven spent three weeks in August 1811 and another short period during the summer of 1812 at Teplitz. He is known to have visited Seume's grave, and wrote to a music teacher from Cassel, Georg Christoph Grosheim (1764–1841), telling him of the feelings of admiration for Seume that that occasion had produced in him. In his letter to Beethoven of 10 November 1819, Grosheim talks of a "marriage" of Seume's poem "Die Beterin" ("The Pleader") with Beethoven's "Moonlight" Sonata. It is unclear whether this was a reference to an idea that had been previously discussed between the two men, or a new idea of Grosheim's. Thayer also reports that Grosheim had tried to persuade Beethoven to arrange the slow opening movement of the "Moonlight" Sonata for voice and piano, to the words of Seume's poem Die Beterin. Beethoven is said to have agreed to the idea, but nothing ever came of it.

Nevertheless, in the minds of some writers the association between "Die Beterin" and the sonata came to assume more solidity than it ever had in reality. "Die Beterin" was also sometimes said to be a painting. In the 1954 edition of Grove's Dictionary of Music, it is specifically denied that the "Moonlight" Sonata has any connection with "a picture, Die Beterin (The Pleader)".

Beethoven had two volumes of Seume's works in his possession when he died.
