= Zorbau =

- Ortsteil of Lützen
- Interactive map of Zorbau
- Location within Germany Location within Saxony-Anhalt
- Coordinates: 51°12′N 12°1′E
- Country: Germany
- State: Saxony-Anhalt
- District: Burgenlandkreis
- Town: Lützen

Area
  - Total: 9.67 km^{2} (3.73 sq mi)
- Elevation: 154 m (505 ft)

Population (2009-12-31)
  - Total: 810
  - Density: 84/km^{2} (220/sq mi)
- Time zone: UTC+01:00 (CET)
  - Summer (DST): UTC+02:00 (CEST)
- Postal codes: 06679
- Dialling codes: 034441
- Vehicle registration: BLK
- Website: http://www.zorbau.de

Zorbau is a village and a former municipality in the Burgenlandkreis district, in Saxony-Anhalt, Germany. Since 1 January 2011, it is part of the town Lützen.

The organist and composer Michael-Christfried Winkler was born in Zorbau.
