= Dehlitz =

- Ortsteil of Lützen
- Interactive map of Dehlitz
- Location within Germany Location within Saxony-Anhalt
- Coordinates: 51°14′N 12°1′E
- Country: Germany
- State: Saxony-Anhalt
- District: Burgenlandkreis
- Town: Lützen

Area
  - Total: 7.16 km^{2} (2.76 sq mi)
- Elevation: 109 m (358 ft)

Population (2009-12-31)
  - Total: 544
  - Density: 76.0/km^{2} (197/sq mi)
- Time zone: UTC+01:00 (CET)
  - Summer (DST): UTC+02:00 (CEST)
- Postal codes: 06686
- Dialling codes: 03443

Dehlitz (German pronunciation: [ˈdeːlɪts]) is a village and a former municipality in the Burgenlandkreis district, in Saxony-Anhalt, Germany. Since 1 January 2011, it is part of the town Lützen.
