= Lützen =

- Town
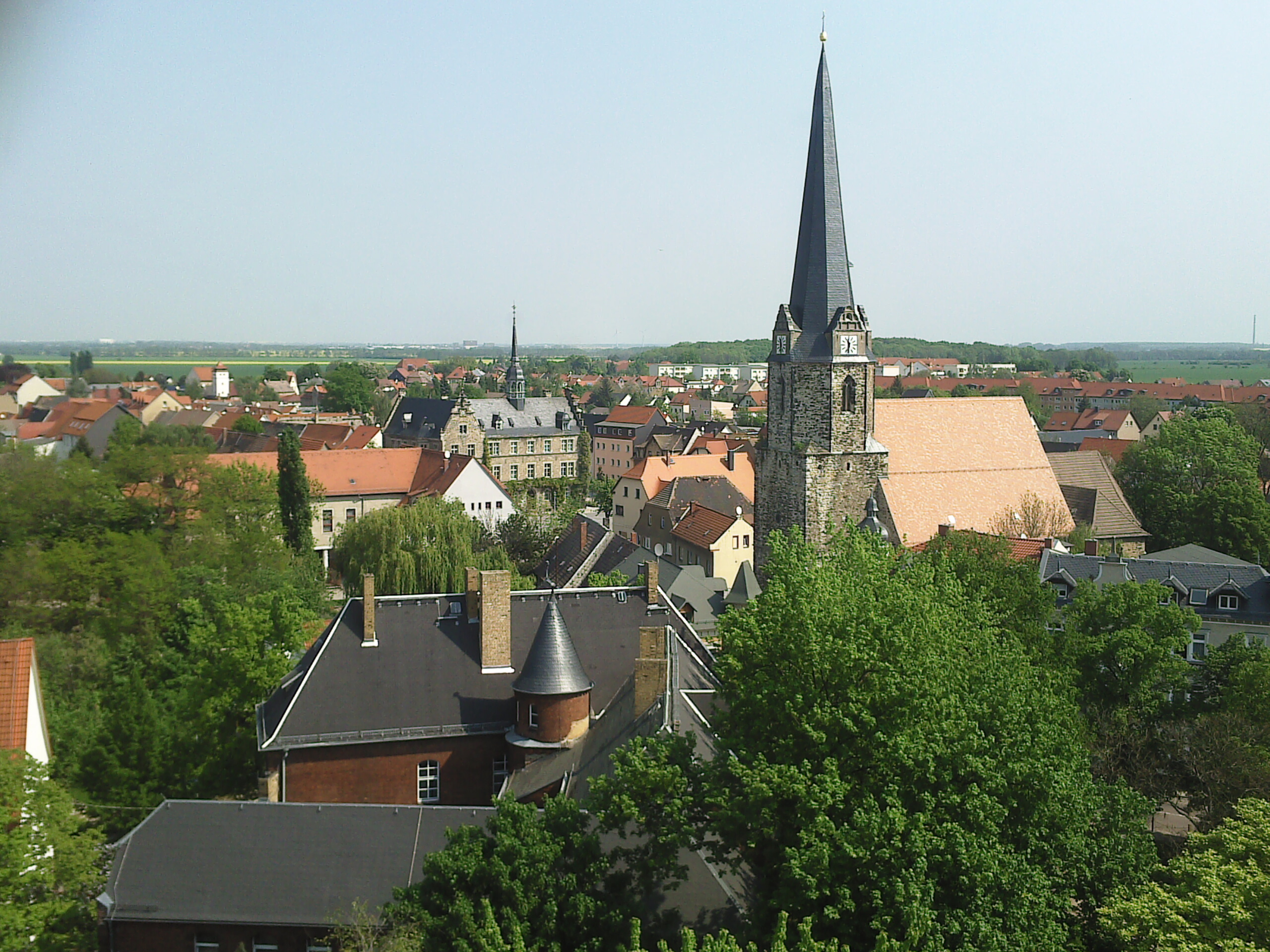
- View from Lützen Castle

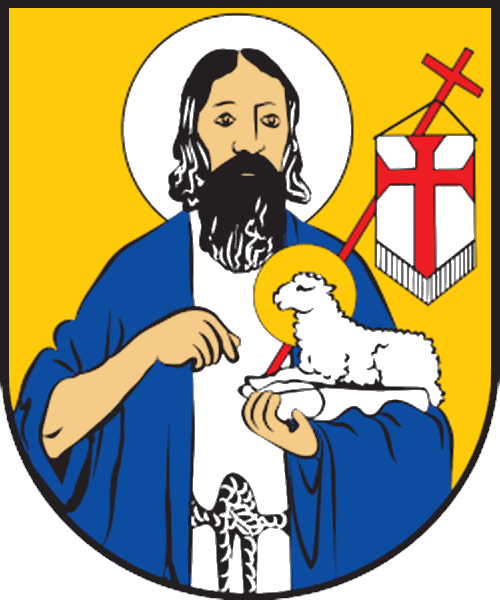
- Coat of arms

- Location of Lützen within Burgenlandkreis district
- Interactive map of Lützen
- Location within Germany Location within Saxony-Anhalt
- Coordinates: 51°15′35″N 12°08′30″E
- Country: Germany
- State: Saxony-Anhalt
- District: Burgenlandkreis

Government
  - Mayor (2017–24): Uwe Weiß (SPD)

Area
  - Total: 96.49 km^{2} (37.25 sq mi)
- Elevation: 220 m (720 ft)

Population (2025-12-31)
  - Total: 8,207
  - Density: 85.06/km^{2} (220.3/sq mi)
- Time zone: UTC+01:00 (CET)
  - Summer (DST): UTC+02:00 (CEST)
- Postal codes: 06679, 06686
- Dialling codes: 034441, 034444
- Vehicle registration: BLK
- Website: www.stadt-luetzen.de

Lützen (German pronunciation: [ˈlʏtsn̩]) is a town in the Burgenlandkreis district of Saxony-Anhalt, Germany.

== Geography ==
Lützen is situated in the Leipzig Bay, approximately 10 km (6.2 mi) southwest of the Leipzig city limits and 14 km (8.7 mi) northeast of Weißenfels. The town has access to the Bundesstraße 87 road from Leipzig to Weißenfels as well as to the Bundesautobahn 9 (at the Bad Dürrenberg junction) and the Bundesautobahn 38.

The municipal area comprises the following Ortschaften or municipal divisions:

- Lützen
- Meuchen, incorporated in 1973
- Röcken, incorporated in 2009
- Großgörschen, Muschwitz, Poserna, Rippach and Starsiedel, incorporated in 2010
- Dehlitz, Sössen and Zorbau, incorporated in 2011

== History ==
Held by the Prince-Bishops of Merseburg, Lützen Castle from the 13th century onwards was the seat of the local administration (Amt). After the 1485 Treaty of Leipzig, the town increasingly fell under the Wettin electors of Saxony, until the episcopal lands were finally secularised in 1547; from 1656/57 until 1738 it was held by the secundogeniture of Saxe-Merseburg.

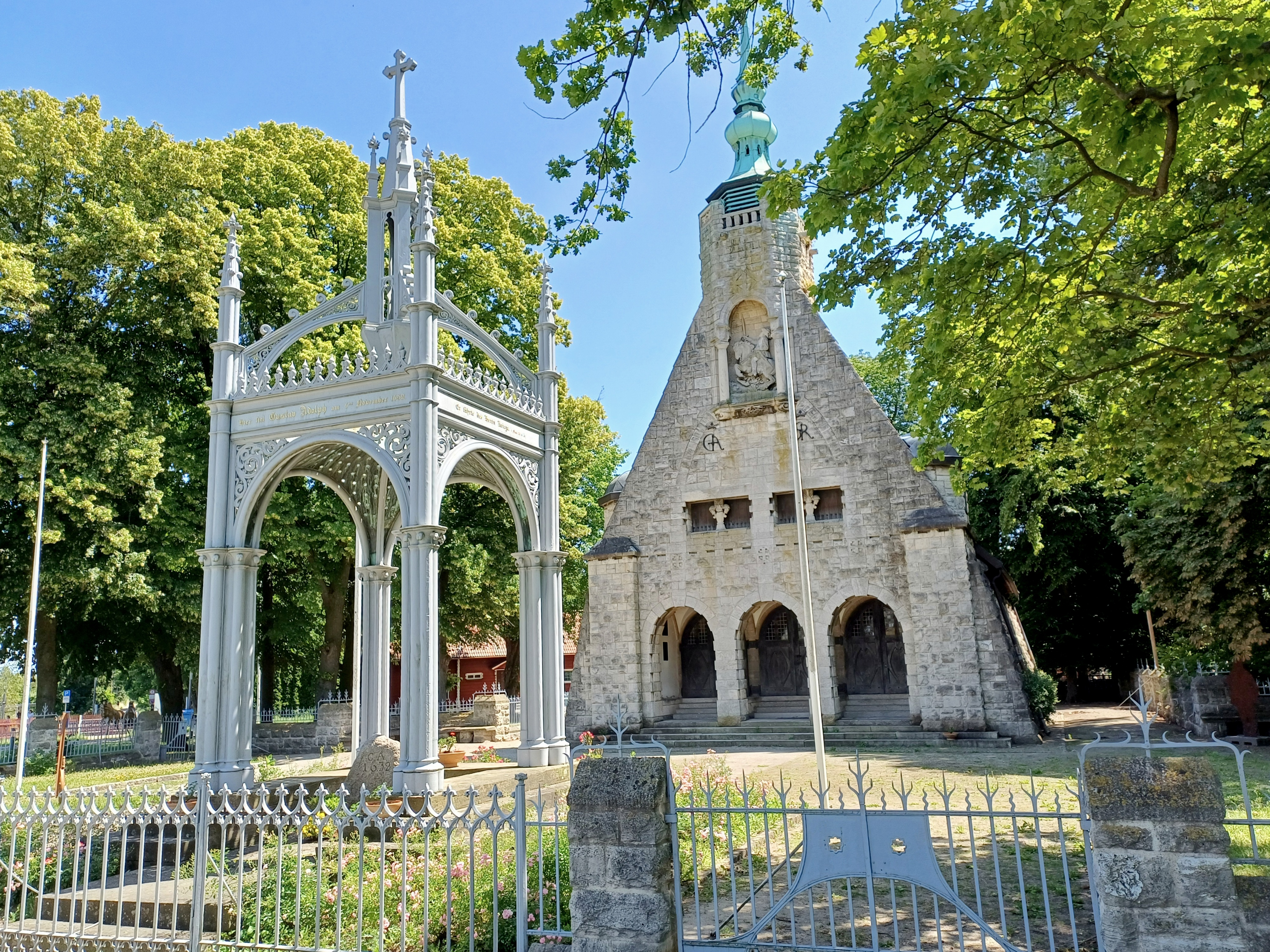
Gustavus Adolphus memorial with Schinkel canopy

The town was the scene of two famous battles:

- The Battle of Lützen (1632) in the Thirty Years' War, in which the Swedish forces under King Gustavus Adolphus of Sweden defeated an Imperial army led by Albrecht von Wallenstein. However, Gustavus Adolphus himself died on the battlefield, resulting in the battle being a Pyrrhic victory for Sweden. There is a statue in Lützen in his memory. Also, there is a stone, called Schwedenstein (Swedenstone), covered by a Neo-Gothic style monument designed by Karl Friedrich Schinkel in 1837 on the spot on the battlefield where he died. Close to this there is a memorial chapel in his honour.
- The Battle of Lützen (1813), in which Napoleon launched the German Campaign. He defeated the combined Russian and Prussian forces near the village of Großgörschen, although with heavy losses. In the night before the battle, he had ostentatiously camped at the Gustavus Adolphus memorial stone.

By 1815 resolution of the Vienna Congress, Lützen fell to the Prussian province of Saxony. Part of the Soviet occupation zone after World War II, the town belonged to the East German district of Halle from 1952 to 1990.

In 2017 a mass grave with 47 bodies from the Battle of Lützen (1632) was found near the town.

== Politics ==
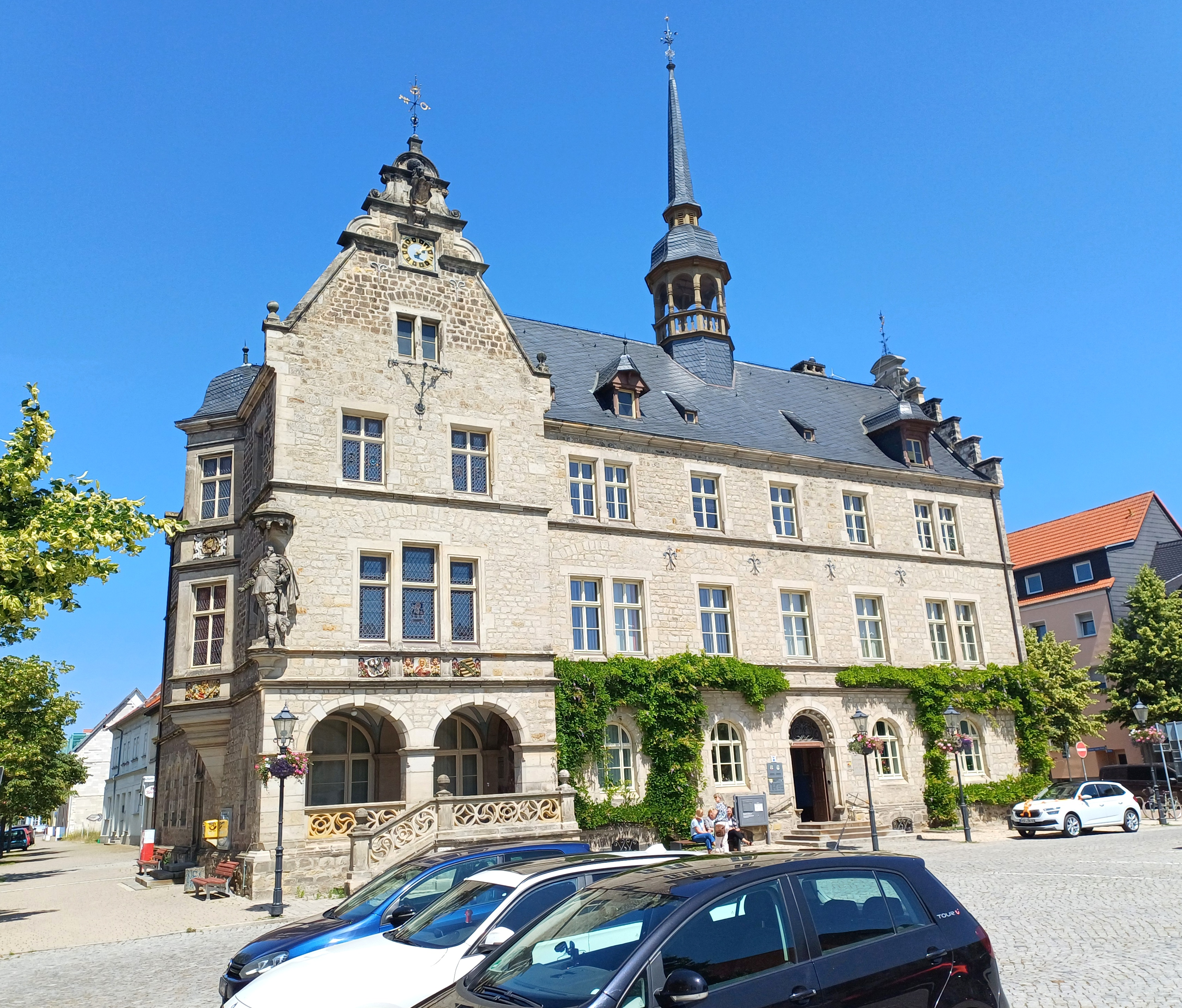
Town hall

Seats in the town's assembly (Stadtrat) as of 2019 local elections:

- Christian Democratic Union of Germany (CDU): 4
- Social Democratic Party of Germany (SPD): 3
- The Left: 2
- Alliance '90/The Greens: 2
- National Democratic Party of Germany (NPD): 1
- Free Democratic Party (FDP): 1
- Independents: 7

== Notable people ==
- Johann Gottfried Seume (1763–1810), author
- Friedrich Nietzsche (1844–1900), philosopher, cultural critic, poet and scholar
