= Samuel Marolois =

Dutch mathematician and engineer

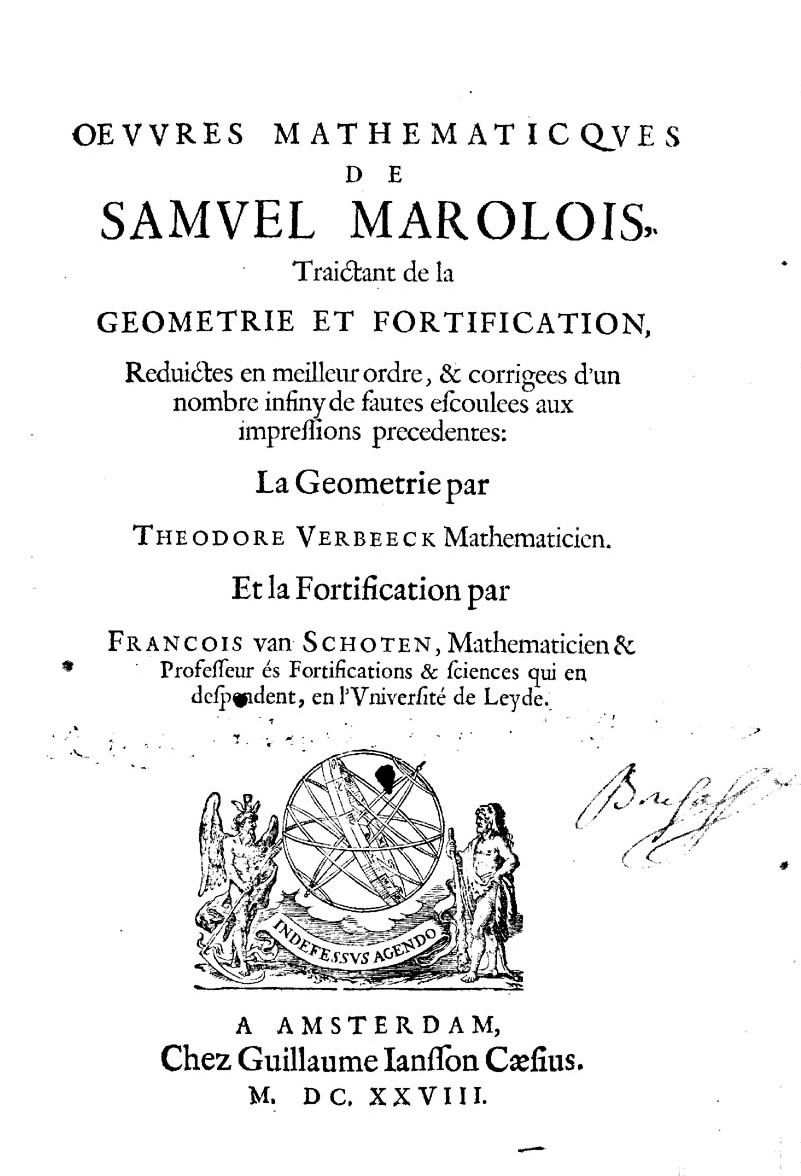
Title page of Marolois' Opera mathematica, 1633

Samuel Marolois (c. 1572 – before 1627) was a Dutch mathematician and military engineer who is best known for his work on perspective.

== Life and work ==
Marolois (or Marlois) was born c. 1572 in the Dutch Republic (possibly in The Hague) as son of Nicolas Marolois, a Protestant native of Valenciennes who had been exiled from France and served the Prince of Orange. Marolois became a mathematician and earthworks engineer in the employ of Maurice, Prince of Orange He was married to Hester le Maire, which made him a brother-in-law of the Amsterdam merchants Thomas le Maire and Pieter le Fevre. In March 1611, he bought a house in The Hague. After the death of Ludolph van Ceulen, Marolois attempted unsuccessfully to succeed him as Chair of Mathematics in Leiden.

Marolois wrote a book on perspective, La perspective contenant la theorie et la practique d'icelle, which was published in 1614 and printed many times in other languages including Dutch, German and Latin. The book had both theoretical and practical elements. The theoretical parts were mostly taken from the works of Guidobaldo del Monte, while the practical parts included many examples. In total, 275 figures are printed in the book. While Marolois' work contributed little to the mathematical theory of perspective, his book was influential in spreading awareness of the ideas. The artist Joshua Kirby later claimed it was one of the most important early books on perspective.

Marolois was a military adviser to the Dutch Republic 1612–1619. His Fortification ou architecture militaire described the cheapest way to build fortifications. It was the first systematic treatment of the Dutch system of fortifications, using geometric operations to draw polygonal plans, and is famous for the drawing of the citadel of Coevorden.

Marolois died in The Hague before 1627. Albert Girard prepared an edition of his mathematical works that was published in 1628.
