= Rippach =

- Stadtteil of Lützen
- Interactive map of Rippach
- Location within Germany Location within Saxony-Anhalt
- Coordinates: 51°14′N 12°4′E
- Country: Germany
- State: Saxony-Anhalt
- District: Burgenlandkreis
- Town: Lützen

Area
  - Total: 7.79 km^{2} (3.01 sq mi)
- Elevation: 129 m (423 ft)

Population (2006-12-31)
  - Total: 689
  - Density: 88.4/km^{2} (229/sq mi)
- Time zone: UTC+01:00 (CET)
  - Summer (DST): UTC+02:00 (CEST)
- Postal codes: 06686
- Dialling codes: 03443

Rippach (German pronunciation: [ˈʁɪpax]) is a village and a former municipality in the Burgenlandkreis district, in Saxony-Anhalt, Germany.

Since 1 January 2010, it is part of the town Lützen.
