= Astronomical coordinate systems =

System for specifying positions of celestial objects

Orientation of astronomical coordinates
- A star's galactic, ecliptic, and equatorial coordinates, as projected on the celestial sphere. Ecliptic and equatorial coordinates share the March equinox as the primary direction, and galactic coordinates are referred to the galactic center. The origin of coordinates (the "center of the sphere") is ambiguous; see celestial sphere for more information.

In astronomy, coordinate systems are used for specifying positions of celestial objects (satellites, planets, stars, galaxies, etc.) relative to a given reference frame, based on physical reference points available to a situated observer (e.g. the true horizon and north to an observer on Earth's surface). Coordinate systems in astronomy can specify an object's relative position in three-dimensional space or plot merely by its direction on a celestial sphere, if the object's distance is unknown or trivial.

Spherical coordinates, projected on the celestial sphere, are analogous to the geographic coordinate system used on the surface of Earth. These differ in their choice of fundamental plane, which divides the celestial sphere into two equal hemispheres along a great circle. Rectangular coordinates, in appropriate units, have the same fundamental (x, y) plane and primary (x-axis) direction, such as an axis of rotation. Each coordinate system is named after its choice of fundamental plane.

== Coordinate systems ==
The following table lists the common coordinate systems in use by the astronomical community. The fundamental plane divides the celestial sphere into two equal hemispheres and defines the baseline for the latitudinal coordinates, similar to the equator in the geographic coordinate system. The poles are located at ±90° from the fundamental plane. The primary direction is the starting point of the longitudinal coordinates. The origin is the zero distance point, the "center of the celestial sphere", although the definition of celestial sphere is ambiguous about the definition of its center point.

Coordinate system	Center point (origin)	Fundamental plane (0° latitude)	Poles	Coordinates		Primary direction (0° longitude)
Coordinate system	Center point (origin)	Fundamental plane (0° latitude)	Poles	Latitude	Longitude	Primary direction (0° longitude)
Horizontal (also called alt-az or el-az)	Observer	Horizon	Zenith, nadir	Altitude (a) or elevation	Azimuth (A)	North or south point of horizon
Equatorial	Center of the Earth (geocentric), or Sun (heliocentric)	Celestial equator	Celestial poles	Declination (δ)	Right ascension (α) or hour angle (h)	March equinox
Ecliptic	Center of the Earth (geocentric), or Sun (heliocentric)	Ecliptic	Ecliptic poles	Ecliptic latitude (β)	Ecliptic longitude (λ)	March equinox
Galactic	Center of the Sun	Galactic plane	Galactic poles	Galactic latitude (b)	Galactic longitude (l)	Galactic Center
Supergalactic		Supergalactic plane	Supergalactic poles	Supergalactic latitude (SGB)	Supergalactic longitude (SGL)	Intersection of supergalactic plane and galactic plane

=== Horizontal system ===
Equatorial (red) and horizontal (blue) celestial coordinates

The horizontal, or altitude-azimuth, system is based on the position of the observer on Earth, which rotates around its own axis once per sidereal day (23 hours, 56 minutes and 4.091 seconds) in relation to the sidereal background. The positioning of a celestial object by the horizontal system varies with time, but is a useful coordinate system for locating and tracking objects for observers on Earth. It is based on the position of stars relative to an observer's ideal horizon.

=== Equatorial system ===
The equatorial coordinate system is centered at Earth's center, but fixed relative to the celestial poles and the March equinox. The coordinates are based on the location of stars relative to Earth's equator if it were projected out to an infinite distance. The equatorial describes the sky as seen from the Solar System, and modern star maps almost exclusively use equatorial coordinates.

The equatorial system is the normal coordinate system for most professional and many amateur astronomers having an equatorial mount that follows the movement of the sky during the night. Celestial objects are found by adjusting the telescope's or other instrument's scales so that they match the equatorial coordinates of the selected object to observe.

Popular choices of pole and equator are the older B1950 and the modern J2000 systems, but a pole and equator "of date" can also be used, meaning one appropriate to the date under consideration, such as when a measurement of the position of a planet or spacecraft is made. There are also subdivisions into "mean of date" coordinates, which average out or ignore nutation, and "true of date," which include nutation.

=== Ecliptic system ===
The fundamental plane is the plane of the Earth's orbit, called the ecliptic plane. There are two principal variants of the ecliptic coordinate system: geocentric ecliptic coordinates centered on the Earth and heliocentric ecliptic coordinates centered on the center of mass of the Solar System.

The geocentric ecliptic system was the principal coordinate system for ancient astronomy and is still useful for computing the apparent motions of the Sun, Moon, and planets. It was used to define the twelve astrological signs of the zodiac, for instance.

The heliocentric ecliptic system describes the planets' orbital movement around the Sun, and centers on the barycenter of the Solar System (i.e. very close to the center of the Sun). The system is primarily used for computing the positions of planets and other Solar System bodies, as well as defining their orbital elements.

=== Galactic system ===
The galactic coordinate system uses the approximate plane of the Milky Way Galaxy as its fundamental plane. The Solar System is still the center of the coordinate system, and the zero point is defined as the direction towards the Galactic Center. Galactic latitude resembles the elevation above the galactic plane and galactic longitude determines direction relative to the center of the galaxy.

=== Supergalactic system ===
The supergalactic coordinate system corresponds to a fundamental plane that contains a higher than average number of local galaxies in the sky as seen from Earth.

== Converting coordinates ==
Conversions between the various coordinate systems are given. See the notes before using these equations.

=== Notation ===
- Horizontal coordinates
  - A, azimuth
  - a, altitude
- Equatorial coordinates
  - α, right ascension
  - δ, declination
  - h, hour angle
- Ecliptic coordinates
  - λ, ecliptic longitude
  - β, ecliptic latitude
- Galactic coordinates
  - l, galactic longitude
  - b, galactic latitude
- Miscellaneous
  - λ_{o}, observer's longitude
  - ϕ_{o}, observer's latitude
  - ε, obliquity of the ecliptic (about 23.4°)
  - θ_{L}, local sidereal time
  - θ_{G}, Greenwich sidereal time

=== Hour angle ↔ right ascension ===
$$\begin{align}
h &= \theta_\text{L} - \alpha & &\mbox{or} &      h &= \theta_\text{G} + \lambda_\text{o} - \alpha \\
\alpha &= \theta_\text{L} - h      & &\mbox{or} & \alpha &= \theta_\text{G} + \lambda_\text{o} - h
\end{align}$$

=== Equatorial ↔ ecliptic ===
The classical equations, derived from spherical trigonometry, for the longitudinal coordinate are presented to the right of a bracket; dividing the first equation by the second gives the convenient tangent equation seen on the left. The rotation matrix equivalent is given beneath each case. This division is ambiguous because tan has a period of 180° (π) whereas cos and sin have periods of 360° (2π).

$$\begin{align}
\tan\left(\lambda\right) &= {\sin\left(\alpha\right) \cos\left(\varepsilon\right) + \tan\left(\delta\right) \sin\left(\varepsilon\right) \over \cos\left(\alpha\right)}; \qquad\begin{cases}
\cos\left(\beta\right) \sin\left(\lambda\right) = \cos\left(\delta\right) \sin\left(\alpha\right) \cos\left(\varepsilon\right) + \sin\left(\delta\right) \sin\left(\varepsilon\right); \\
\cos\left(\beta\right) \cos\left(\lambda\right) = \cos\left(\delta\right) \cos\left(\alpha\right).
\end{cases} \\
\sin\left(\beta\right) &= \sin\left(\delta\right) \cos\left(\varepsilon\right) - \cos\left(\delta\right) \sin\left(\varepsilon\right) \sin\left(\alpha\right) \\[3pt]
\begin{bmatrix}
\cos\left(\beta\right)\cos\left(\lambda\right) \\
\cos\left(\beta\right)\sin\left(\lambda\right) \\
\sin\left(\beta\right)
\end{bmatrix} &= \begin{bmatrix}
1 &  0                            & 0                            \\
0 &  \cos\left(\varepsilon\right) & \sin\left(\varepsilon\right) \\
0 & -\sin\left(\varepsilon\right) & \cos\left(\varepsilon\right)
\end{bmatrix}\begin{bmatrix}
\cos\left(\delta\right)\cos\left(\alpha\right) \\
\cos\left(\delta\right)\sin\left(\alpha\right) \\
\sin\left(\delta\right)
\end{bmatrix} \\[6pt]
\tan\left(\alpha\right) &= {\sin\left(\lambda\right) \cos\left(\varepsilon\right) - \tan\left(\beta\right) \sin\left(\varepsilon\right) \over \cos\left(\lambda\right)} ; \qquad \begin{cases}
\cos\left(\delta\right) \sin\left(\alpha\right) = \cos\left(\beta\right) \sin\left(\lambda\right) \cos\left(\varepsilon\right) - \sin\left(\beta\right) \sin\left(\varepsilon\right); \\
\cos\left(\delta\right) \cos\left(\alpha\right) = \cos\left(\beta\right) \cos\left(\lambda\right).
\end{cases} \\[3pt]
\sin\left(\delta\right) &= \sin\left(\beta\right) \cos\left(\varepsilon\right) + \cos\left(\beta\right) \sin\left(\varepsilon\right) \sin\left(\lambda\right). \\[6pt]
\begin{bmatrix}
\cos\left(\delta\right)\cos\left(\alpha\right) \\
\cos\left(\delta\right)\sin\left(\alpha\right) \\
\sin\left(\delta\right)
\end{bmatrix} &= \begin{bmatrix}
1 & 0                            &  0                            \\
0 & \cos\left(\varepsilon\right) & -\sin\left(\varepsilon\right) \\
0 & \sin\left(\varepsilon\right) &  \cos\left(\varepsilon\right)
\end{bmatrix}\begin{bmatrix}
\cos\left(\beta\right)\cos\left(\lambda\right) \\
\cos\left(\beta\right)\sin\left(\lambda\right) \\
\sin\left(\beta\right)
\end{bmatrix}.
\end{align}$$

=== Equatorial ↔ horizontal ===
Azimuth (A) is measured from the south point, turning positive to the west. Zenith distance, the angular distance along the great circle from the zenith to a celestial object, is simply the complementary angle of the altitude: 90° − a.

$$\begin{align}
\tan\left(A\right) &= {\sin\left(h\right) \over \cos\left(h\right) \sin\left(\phi_\text{o}\right) - \tan\left(\delta\right) \cos\left(\phi_\text{o}\right)}; \qquad \begin{cases}
\cos\left(a\right) \sin\left(A\right) = \cos\left(\delta\right) \sin\left(h\right) ;\\
\cos\left(a\right) \cos\left(A\right) = \cos\left(\delta\right) \cos\left(h\right) \sin\left(\phi_\text{o}\right) - \sin\left(\delta\right) \cos\left(\phi_\text{o}\right)
\end{cases} \\[3pt]
\sin\left(a\right) &= \sin\left(\phi_\text{o}\right) \sin\left(\delta\right) + \cos\left(\phi_\text{o}\right) \cos\left(\delta\right) \cos\left(h\right);
\end{align}$$

In solving the tan(A) equation for A, in order to avoid the ambiguity of the arctangent, use of the two-argument arctangent, denoted atan2(x,y), is recommended. The two-argument arctangent computes the arctangent of y/x, and accounts for the quadrant in which it is being computed. Thus, consistent with the convention of azimuth being measured from the south and opening positive to the west,

$$A = -\operatorname{atan2}(y,x)$$,

where

$$\begin{align}
x &= -\sin\left(\phi_\text{o}\right) \cos\left(\delta\right) \cos\left(h\right) + \cos\left(\phi_\text{o}\right) \sin\left(\delta\right) \\
y &=  \cos\left(\delta\right) \sin\left(h\right)
\end{align}$$.

If the above formula produces a negative value for A, it can be rendered positive by simply adding 360°.

$$\begin{align}
\begin{bmatrix}
\cos\left(a\right) \cos\left(A\right) \\
\cos\left(a\right) \sin\left(A\right) \\
\sin\left(a\right)
\end{bmatrix} &= \begin{bmatrix}
\sin\left(\phi_\text{o}\right) & 0 & -\cos\left(\phi_\text{o}\right) \\
0                              & 1 &  0                              \\
\cos\left(\phi_\text{o}\right) & 0 &  \sin\left(\phi_\text{o}\right)
\end{bmatrix}\begin{bmatrix}
\cos\left(\delta\right)\cos\left(h\right) \\
\cos\left(\delta\right)\sin\left(h\right) \\
\sin\left(\delta\right)
\end{bmatrix} \\
&= \begin{bmatrix}
\sin\left(\phi_\text{o}\right) & 0 & -\cos\left(\phi_\text{o}\right) \\
0                              & 1 &  0                              \\
\cos\left(\phi_\text{o}\right) & 0 &  \sin\left(\phi_\text{o}\right)
\end{bmatrix}\begin{bmatrix}
\cos\left(\theta_L\right) &  \sin\left(\theta_L\right) & 0 \\
\sin\left(\theta_L\right) & -\cos\left(\theta_L\right) & 0 \\
0            &  0            & 1
\end{bmatrix}\begin{bmatrix}
\cos\left(\delta\right)\cos\left(\alpha\right) \\
\cos\left(\delta\right)\sin\left(\alpha\right) \\
\sin\left(\delta\right)
\end{bmatrix}; \\[6pt]
\tan\left(h\right) &= {\sin\left(A\right) \over \cos\left(A\right) \sin\left(\phi_\text{o}\right) + \tan\left(a\right) \cos\left(\phi_\text{o}\right)}; \qquad \begin{cases}
\cos\left(\delta\right) \sin\left(h\right) = \cos\left(a\right) \sin\left(A\right); \\
\cos\left(\delta\right) \cos\left(h\right) = \sin\left(a\right) \cos\left(\phi_\text{o}\right) + \cos\left(a\right) \cos\left(A\right) \sin\left(\phi_\text{o}\right)
\end{cases} \\[3pt]
\sin\left(\delta\right) &= \sin\left(\phi_\text{o}\right) \sin\left(a\right) - \cos\left(\phi_\text{o}\right) \cos\left(a\right) \cos\left(A\right);
\end{align}$$
(Note: Depending on the azimuth convention in use, the signs of cos A and sin A appear in all four different combinations. Karttunen et al., Taff, and Roth define A clockwise from the south. Lang defines it north through east, Smart north through west. Meeus (1991), p. 89: sin δ = sin φ sin a − cos φ cos a cos A; Explanatory Supplement (1961), p. 26: sin δ = sin a sin φ + cos a cos A cos φ.)

Again, in solving the tan(h) equation for h, use of the two-argument arctangent that accounts for the quadrant is recommended. Thus, again consistent with the convention of azimuth being measured from the south and opening positive to the west,

$$h = \operatorname{atan2}(y, x)$$,

where

$$\begin{align}
x &= \sin\left(\phi_\text{o}\right)\cos\left(a\right) \cos\left(A\right) + \cos\left(\phi_\text{o}\right)\sin\left(a\right) \\
y &= \cos\left(a\right)\sin\left(A\right) \\[3pt]
\begin{bmatrix}
\cos\left(\delta\right)\cos\left(h\right) \\
\cos\left(\delta\right)\sin\left(h\right) \\
\sin\left(\delta\right)
\end{bmatrix} &= \begin{bmatrix}
\sin\left(\phi_\text{o}\right) & 0 & \cos\left(\phi_\text{o}\right) \\
0                              & 1 & 0                              \\
-\cos\left(\phi_\text{o}\right) & 0 & \sin\left(\phi_\text{o}\right)
\end{bmatrix}\begin{bmatrix}
\cos\left(a\right) \cos\left(A\right) \\
\cos\left(a\right) \sin\left(A\right) \\
\sin\left(a\right)
\end{bmatrix} \\
\begin{bmatrix}
\cos\left(\delta\right) \cos\left(\alpha\right) \\
\cos\left(\delta\right) \sin\left(\alpha\right) \\
\sin\left(\delta\right)
\end{bmatrix} &= \begin{bmatrix}
\cos\left(\theta_L\right) &  \sin\left(\theta_L\right) & 0 \\
\sin\left(\theta_L\right) & -\cos\left(\theta_L\right) & 0 \\
0                         &  0                         & 1
\end{bmatrix}\begin{bmatrix}
\sin\left(\phi_\text{o}\right) & 0 & \cos\left(\phi_\text{o}\right) \\
0                              & 1 & 0                              \\
-\cos\left(\phi_\text{o}\right) & 0 & \sin\left(\phi_\text{o}\right)
\end{bmatrix}\begin{bmatrix}
\cos\left(a\right) \cos\left(A\right) \\
\cos\left(a\right) \sin\left(A\right) \\
\sin\left(a\right)
\end{bmatrix}.
\end{align}$$

=== Equatorial ↔ galactic ===
These equations are for converting equatorial coordinates to Galactic coordinates.

$$\begin{align}
\cos\left(l_\text{NCP} - l\right)\cos(b) &= \sin\left(\delta\right) \cos\left(\delta_\text{G}\right) - \cos\left(\delta\right)\sin\left(\delta_\text{G}\right)\cos\left(\alpha - \alpha_\text{G}\right) \\
\sin\left(l_\text{NCP} - l\right)\cos(b) &= \cos(\delta)\sin\left(\alpha - \alpha_\text{G}\right) \\
\sin\left(b\right) &= \sin\left(\delta\right) \sin\left(\delta_\text{G}\right) + \cos\left(\delta\right) \cos\left(\delta_\text{G}\right) \cos\left(\alpha - \alpha_\text{G}\right)
\end{align}$$

$\alpha_\text{G}, \delta_\text{G}$ are the equatorial coordinates of the North Galactic Pole and $l_\text{NCP}$ is the Galactic longitude of the North Celestial Pole. Referred to J2000.0 the values of these quantities are:

$$\alpha_G = 192.85948^\circ \qquad \delta_G = 27.12825^\circ \qquad l_\text{NCP}=122.93192^\circ$$

If the equatorial coordinates are referred to another equinox, they must be precessed to their place at J2000.0 before applying these formulae.

These equations convert to equatorial coordinates referred to B2000.0.

$$\begin{align}
\sin\left(\alpha - \alpha_\text{G}\right)\cos\left(\delta\right) &= \cos\left(b\right) \sin\left(l_\text{NCP} - l\right) \\
\cos\left(\alpha - \alpha_\text{G}\right)\cos\left(\delta\right) &= \sin\left(b\right) \cos\left(\delta_\text{G}\right) - \cos\left(b\right) \sin\left(\delta_\text{G}\right)\cos\left(l_\text{NCP} - l\right) \\
\sin\left(\delta\right) &= \sin\left(b\right) \sin\left(\delta_\text{G}\right) + \cos\left(b\right) \cos\left(\delta_\text{G}\right) \cos\left(l_\text{NCP} - l\right)
\end{align}$$

=== Notes on conversion ===
- Angles in the degrees ( ° ), minutes ( ′ ), and seconds ( ″ ) of sexagesimal measure must be converted to decimal before calculations are performed. Whether they are converted to decimal degrees or radians depends upon the particular calculating machine or program. Negative angles must be carefully handled; −10° 20′ 30″ must be converted as −10° −20′ −30″.
- Angles in the hours ( ^{h} ), minutes ( ^{m} ), and seconds ( ^{s} ) of time measure must be converted to decimal degrees or radians before calculations are performed. 1^{h} = 15°; 1^{m} = 15′; 1^{s} = 15″
- Angles greater than 360° (2π) or less than 0° may need to be reduced to the range 0°–360° (0–2π) depending upon the particular calculating machine or program.
- The cosine of a latitude (declination, ecliptic and Galactic latitude, and altitude) are never negative by definition, since the latitude varies between −90° and +90°.
- Inverse trigonometric functions arcsine, arccosine and arctangent are quadrant-ambiguous, and results should be carefully evaluated. Use of the second arctangent function (denoted in computing as atn2(y,x) or atan2(y,x), which calculates the arctangent of y/x using the sign of both arguments to determine the right quadrant) is recommended when calculating longitude/right ascension/azimuth. An equation which finds the sine, followed by the arcsin function, is recommended when calculating latitude/declination/altitude.
- Azimuth (A) is referred here to the south point of the horizon, the common astronomical reckoning. An object on the meridian to the south of the observer has A = h = 0° with this usage. However, in Astropy's AltAz, in the Large Binocular Telescope FITS file convention, in XEphem, in the IAU library Standards of Fundamental Astronomy and Section B of the Astronomical Almanac for example, the azimuth is East of North. In navigation and some other disciplines, azimuth is figured from the north.
- The equations for altitude (a) do not account for atmospheric refraction.
- The equations for horizontal coordinates do not account for diurnal parallax, that is, the small offset in the position of a celestial object caused by the position of the observer on the Earth's surface. This effect is significant for the Moon, less so for the planets, minute for stars or more distant objects.
- Observer's longitude (λ_{o}) here is measured positively eastward from the prime meridian, accordingly to current IAU standards.

== See also ==
- Apparent longitude
- Azimuth – Horizontal angle from north or other reference cardinal direction
- Barycentric and geocentric celestial reference systems – Celestial coordinate system
- Celestial sphere – Conceptual tool in astronomy
- International Celestial Reference System and its realizations – Current standard celestial reference system and frame
- Orbital elements – Parameters that define a specific orbit
- Planetary coordinate system – Coordinate system for planets
- Terrestrial reference frame – Reference frame for measuring location
