= Ecliptic coordinate system =

Celestial coordinate system used to describe Solar System objects

In astronomy, the ecliptic coordinate system is a celestial coordinate system commonly used for representing the apparent positions, orbits, and pole orientations of Solar System objects. Because most planets (except Mercury) and many small Solar System bodies have orbits with only slight inclinations to the ecliptic, using it as the fundamental plane is convenient. The system's origin can be the center of either the Sun or Earth, its primary direction is towards the March equinox, and it has a right-hand convention. It may be implemented in spherical or rectangular coordinates.

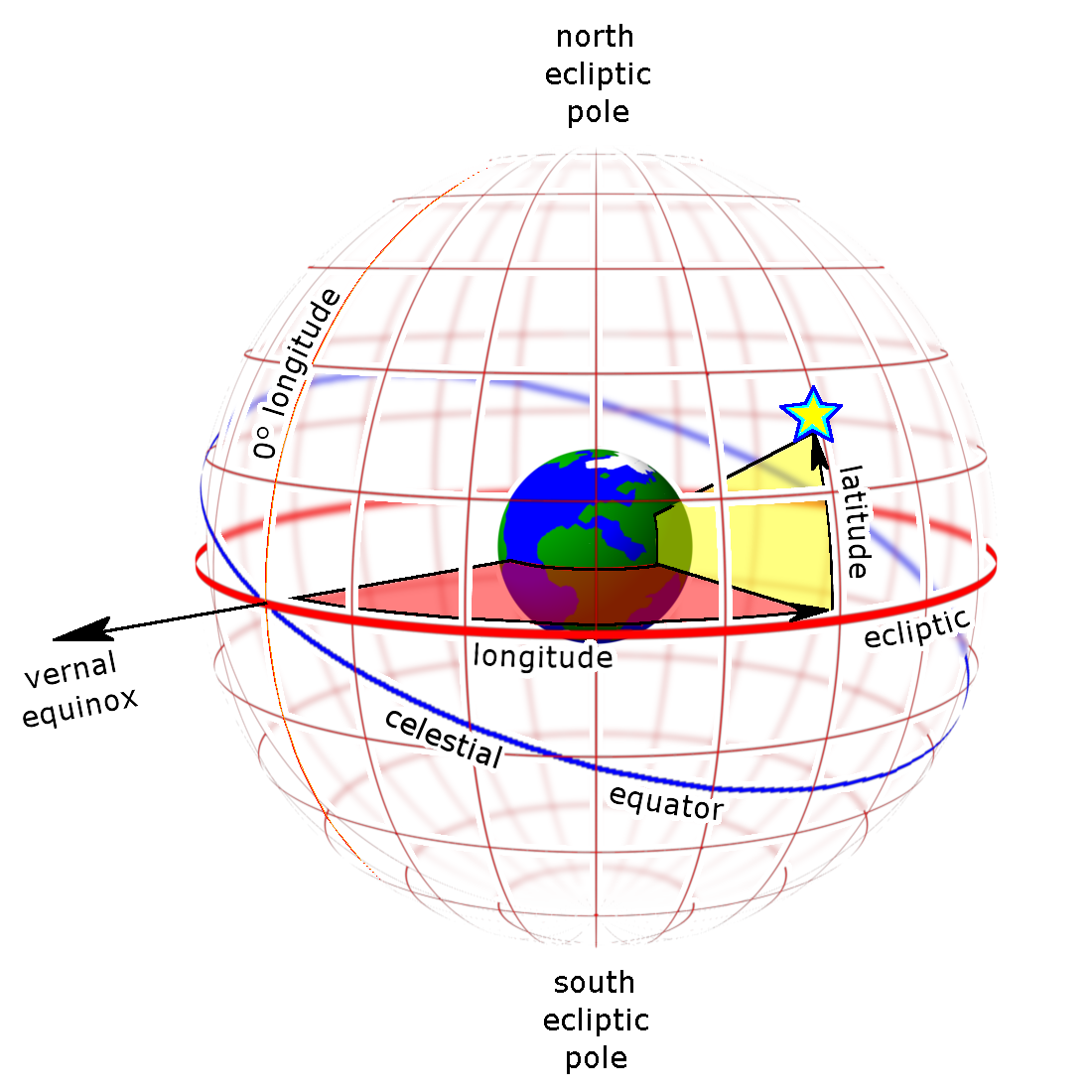
Earth-centered ecliptic coordinates as seen from outside the celestial sphere. Ecliptic longitude; measured along the ecliptic from the March equinox Ecliptic latitude; measured perpendicular to the ecliptic Celestial equator A full globe is shown here, although high-latitude coordinates are seldom seen except for certain comets and asteroids.

== Primary direction ==
The apparent motion of the Sun along the ecliptic (red) as seen on the inside of the celestial sphere. Ecliptic coordinates appear in (red). The celestial equator (blue) and the equatorial coordinates (blue), being inclined to the ecliptic, appear to wobble as the Sun advances.

The celestial equator and the ecliptic are slowly moving relative to the distant stars due to perturbing forces on the Earth, therefore the orientation of the primary direction, their intersection at the March equinox, is not quite fixed. A slow motion of Earth's axis, precession, causes a slow, continuous turning of the coordinate system westward about the poles of the ecliptic, completing one circuit in about 26,000 years. Superimposed on this is a smaller motion of the ecliptic, and a small oscillation of the Earth's axis, nutation.

In order to reference a coordinate system which can be considered as fixed in space, these motions require specification of the equinox of a particular date, known as an epoch, when giving a position in ecliptic coordinates. The three most commonly used are:

Mean equinox of a standard epoch
(usually the J2000.0 epoch, but may include B1950.0, B1900.0, etc.) is a fixed standard direction, allowing positions established at various dates to be compared directly.
Mean equinox of date
is the intersection of the ecliptic of "date" (that is, the ecliptic in its position at that "date") with the mean equator (that is, the equator rotated by precession to its position at "date", but free from the small periodic oscillations of nutation). Commonly used in planetary orbit calculation.
True equinox of date
is the intersection of the ecliptic of "date" with the true equator (that is, the mean equator plus nutation). This is the actual intersection of the two planes at any particular moment, with all motions accounted for.

A position in the ecliptic coordinate system is thus typically specified true equinox and ecliptic of date, mean equinox and ecliptic of J2000.0, or similar. Note that there is no "mean ecliptic", as the ecliptic is not subject to small periodic oscillations.

== Spherical coordinates ==
Summary of notation for ecliptic coordinates
	Spherical			Rectangular
	Longitude	Latitude	Distance	Rectangular
Geocentric	λ	β	Δ	ξ, η, ζ
Heliocentric	ℓ	b	r	x, y, z (Note: Only used occasionally ; x, y, z are typically reserved for equatorial coordinates.)

Ecliptic longitude
Ecliptic longitude or celestial longitude (symbols: heliocentric ℓ, geocentric λ) measures the angular distance of an object along the ecliptic from the primary direction. Like right ascension in the equatorial coordinate system, the primary direction (0° ecliptic longitude) points from the Earth towards the Sun at the March equinox. Because it is a right-handed system, ecliptic longitude is measured positive eastwards in the fundamental plane (the ecliptic) from 0°–360° . Because of axial precession, the ecliptic longitude of most "fixed stars" (referred to the equinox of date) increases by about 50.3 arcseconds per year, or 83.8 arcminutes per century, the speed of general precession. However, for stars near the ecliptic poles, the rate of change of ecliptic longitude is dominated by the slight movement of the ecliptic (that is, of the plane of the Earth's orbit), so the rate of change may be anything from minus infinity to plus infinity depending on the exact position of the star.
Ecliptic latitude
Ecliptic latitude or celestial latitude (symbols: heliocentric b, geocentric β ), measures the angular distance of an object from the ecliptic towards the north (positive) or south (negative) ecliptic pole. For example, the north ecliptic pole has a celestial latitude of +90°. Ecliptic latitude for "fixed stars" is not affected by precession.
Distance
Distance is also necessary for a complete spherical position (symbols: heliocentric r, geocentric Δ). Different distance units are used for different objects. Within the Solar System, astronomical units (AU) are used, and for objects near the Earth, Earth radii, Lunar distances, or thousands of kilometers are used.

=== Historical use ===
From antiquity through the 18th century, ecliptic longitude was commonly measured using twelve zodiacal signs, each of 30° longitude, a practice that continues in modern astrology. The signs are approximately the positions on the ecliptic, relative to the position of the Sun on the March equinox, where constellations were on the ecliptic in the year 200 CE ; however the stars of those constellations have precessed eastward and the stars are now shifted by about one-and-a-half 30° signs from the locations of their nominal zodiacal signs. Longitudes were specified in signs, degrees, minutes, and seconds.

For an example of historical use, a longitude of ♌ 19°55′58″ is 19.933° east of the start of the sign Leo (♌). Since Leo begins 120° from the March equinox, the longitude in modern form is 139° 55′ 58″.

In China, ecliptic longitude is measured using 24 Solar terms, each of 15° longitude, and are used by Chinese lunisolar calendars to stay synchronized with the seasons, which is crucial for agrarian societies.

== Rectangular coordinates ==
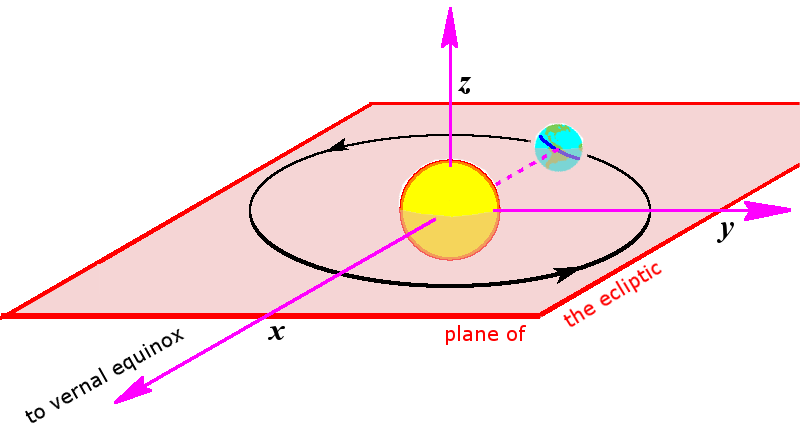
Heliocentric ecliptic coordinates. The origin is the Sun's center, the plane of reference is the ecliptic plane, and the primary direction (the x-axis) is the March equinox. A right-handed rule specifies a y-axis 90° to the east on the fundamental plane. The z-axis points toward the north ecliptic pole. The reference frame is relatively stationary, aligned with the March equinox.

A rectangular variant of ecliptic coordinates is often used in orbital calculations and simulations. It has its origin at the center of the Sun (or at the barycenter of the Solar System), its fundamental plane on the ecliptic plane, and the x-axis toward the March equinox. The coordinates have a right-handed convention, that is, if one extends their right thumb upward, it simulates the z-axis, their extended index finger the x-axis, and the curl of the other fingers points generally in the direction of the y-axis.

These rectangular coordinates are related to the corresponding spherical coordinates by

$$\begin{align}
x &= r \cos b \cos \ell \\
y &= r \cos b \sin \ell \\
z &= r \sin b \end{align}$$

== Conversion between celestial coordinate systems ==
=== Converting Cartesian vectors ===
==== Conversion from ecliptic coordinates to equatorial coordinates ====
$$\begin{bmatrix}
x_\text{equatorial} \\
y_\text{equatorial} \\
z_\text{equatorial} \\
\end{bmatrix}
=
\begin{bmatrix}
1 & 0 & 0 \\
0 & \cos \varepsilon & -\sin \varepsilon \\
0 & \sin \varepsilon &  \cos \varepsilon \\
\end{bmatrix}
\begin{bmatrix}
x_\text{ecliptic} \\
y_\text{ecliptic} \\
z_\text{ecliptic} \\
\end{bmatrix}$$

==== Conversion from equatorial coordinates to ecliptic coordinates ====
$$\begin{bmatrix}
x_\text{ecliptic} \\
y_\text{ecliptic} \\
z_\text{ecliptic} \\
\end{bmatrix}
=
\begin{bmatrix}
1 & 0 & 0 \\
0 & \cos \varepsilon & \sin \varepsilon \\
0 & -\sin \varepsilon & \cos \varepsilon \\
\end{bmatrix}
\begin{bmatrix}
x_\text{equatorial} \\
y_\text{equatorial} \\
z_\text{equatorial} \\
\end{bmatrix}$$
where ε is the obliquity of the ecliptic.

== See also ==
- Celestial coordinate system
- Ecliptic
- Ecliptic pole, where the ecliptic latitude is ±90°
- Equinox
  - Equinox (celestial coordinates)
  - March equinox
