= DFS =

DFS may refer to:

== Brands and enterprises ==
- Dancer Fitzgerald Sample, advertising agency, now Saatchi & Saatchi
- DFS Furniture, a furniture retailer in the United Kingdom and Ireland
- DFS Group (Duty Free Shoppers), Hong Kong
- DFS Program Exchange, a former syndicator of TV programs
- Deutsche Flugsicherung, an air traffic control company

== Organizations ==
- Department of Field Support, a UN department
- Department of Financial Services (disambiguation)
- Department of Financial Studies, University of Delhi, India
- Det frivillige Skyttervesen, the National Rifle Association of Norway
- Deutsche Flugsicherung, the German air traffic control organisation
- Deutsche Forschungsanstalt für Segelflug (German Research Institute for Sailplane Flight)
- Dirección Federal de Seguridad, Federal Direction of Security, Mexico
- New York State Department of Financial Services

== Science and technology ==
=== Computing ===
- Depth-first search, an algorithm for traversing or searching tree or graph data structures
- Discrete Fourier series, the discrete version of Fourier series
- Dynamic frequency scaling, a method for reducing a microprocessor's power consumption
- Dynamic Frequency Selection, part of the IEEE 802.11h wireless standard

==== File systems ====
- Disc Filing System, a filesystem developed by Acorn Computers
- Distributed file system, a method of storing persistent data over computer network
  - Distributed File System (Microsoft), distributed SMB file shares

=== Other uses in science and technology ===
- Cosworth DFS, a motor racing engine
- Decoherence-free subspaces, subspace of a system's Hilbert space where the system is decoupled from the environment
- Demand Flexibility Service, a demand response system for electricity supplies in the United Kingdom
- DFS Kopernikus (Deutscher Fernmeldesatellit Kopernikus), a series of satellites
- Digital Frequency Synthesizer, generation of different frequency from another in phase
- Disease-free survival, a measure of the efficacy of medical treatment
- Double Fourier sphere method in mathematics and geosciences

== Other uses ==
- Daily fantasy sports, a subset of fantasy sport games
- Dorian Finney-Smith, American basketball player
- Dumfriesshire, historic county in Scotland, Chapman code
- Dynamite Fighting Show, a Romanian-based kickboxing promotion company
