= Polar angle =

In geometry, the polar angle may be

- 2D polar angle, the angular coordinate of a two-dimensional polar coordinate system
- 3D polar angle, one of the angular coordinates of a three-dimensional spherical coordinate system
