= Fundamental plane (spherical coordinates) =

Plane of reference that divides the sphere into two hemispheres

The fundamental plane in a spherical coordinate system is a plane of reference that divides the sphere into two hemispheres. The geocentric latitude of a point is then the angle between the fundamental plane and the line joining the point to the centre of the sphere.

For a geographic coordinate system of the Earth, the fundamental plane is the Equator.

Astronomical coordinate systems have varying fundamental planes:

- The horizontal coordinate system uses the observer's horizon.
- The Besselian coordinate system uses Earth's terminator (day/night boundary). This is a Cartesian coordinate system (x, y, z).
- The equatorial coordinate system uses the celestial equator.
- The ecliptic coordinate system uses the ecliptic.
- The galactic coordinate system uses the Milky Way's galactic equator.

== See also ==
- Plane of reference
