= Horizontal coordinate system =

Type of celestial coordinate system

Horizontal coordinates use a celestial sphere centered on the observer. Azimuth is measured eastward from the north point (sometimes from the south point) of the horizon; altitude is the angle above the horizon.

The horizontal coordinate system is a celestial coordinate system that uses the observer's local horizon as the fundamental plane to define two angles of a spherical coordinate system: altitude and azimuth. Therefore, the horizontal coordinate system is sometimes called the az/el system, the alt/az system, or the alt-azimuth system, among others. In an altazimuth mount of a telescope, the instrument's two axes follow altitude and azimuth.

== Definition ==
This celestial coordinate system divides the sky into two hemispheres: The upper hemisphere, where objects are above the horizon and are visible, and the lower hemisphere, where objects are below the horizon and cannot be seen, since the Earth obstructs views of them. (Note: Note that the special conditions described are strictly true only regarding the geometric horizon. That is, the horizon as it would appear for an observer on a perfectly smooth Earth without an atmosphere, for an observer at sea-level. In practice, the apparent horizon has a slight negative altitude due to the curvature of Earth, the value of which gets more negative as the observer ascends higher above sea level. In addition, atmospheric refraction causes celestial objects very close to the horizon to appear about half a degree higher than they would if there were no atmosphere.) The great circle separating the hemispheres is the celestial horizon, which is defined as the great circle on the celestial sphere whose plane is normal to the local gravity vector (the vertical direction). In practice, the horizon can be defined as the plane tangent to a quiet, liquid surface, such as a pool of mercury, or by using a bull's eye level. The pole of the upper hemisphere is called the zenith and the pole of the lower hemisphere is called the nadir.

The following are two independent horizontal angular coordinates:

- Altitude (alt. or altitude angle (Note: Not to be confused with linear altitude, in units of length.)), sometimes referred to as elevation (el. or elevation angle (Note: Not to be confused with linear elevation, in units of length.)) or apparent height, is the angle between the object and the observer's local horizon. For visible objects, it is an angle between 0° and 90°. (Note: Alternatively, zenith angle may be used instead of altitude, as they are complementary angles (the sum of the altitude angle and the zenith angle is 90°).)
- Azimuth (az.) is the angle of the object around the horizon, usually measured from true north and increasing eastward. Exceptions are, for example, ESO's FITS convention where it is measured from the south and increasing westward, or the FITS convention of the Sloan Digital Sky Survey where it is measured from the south and increasing eastward.

A horizontal coordinate system should not be confused with a topocentric coordinate system. Horizontal coordinates define the observer's orientation, but not location of the origin, while topocentric coordinates define the origin location, on the Earth's surface, in contrast to a geocentric celestial system.

== General features ==
The horizontal coordinate system is fixed to a location on Earth, not the stars. Therefore, the altitude and azimuth of an object in the sky changes with time, as the object appears to drift across the sky with Earth's rotation. In addition, since the horizontal system is defined by the observer's local horizon, the same object viewed from different locations on Earth at the same time will have different values of altitude and azimuth.

The cardinal points on the horizon have specific values of azimuth that are helpful references.

Azimuth values for the cardinal directions
Cardinal point	Azimuth
North	0°
East	90°
South	180°
West	270°

Horizontal coordinates are very useful for determining the rise and set times of an object in the sky. When an object's altitude is 0°, it is on the horizon. If at that moment its altitude is increasing, it is rising, but if its altitude is decreasing, it is setting. However, all objects on the celestial sphere are subject to diurnal motion, which always appears to be westward.

A northern observer can determine whether altitude is increasing or decreasing by instead considering the azimuth of the celestial object:

- If the azimuth is between 0° and 180° (north–east–south), the object is rising.
- If the azimuth is between 180° and 360° (south–west–north), the object is setting.

There are the following special cases:

- All directions are south when viewed from the North Pole, and all directions are north when viewed from the South Pole, so the azimuth is undefined in both locations. When viewed from either pole, a star (or any object with fixed equatorial coordinates) has constant altitude and thus never rises or sets. The Sun, Moon, and planets can rise or set over the span of a year when viewed from the poles because their declinations are constantly changing.
- When viewed from the equator, objects on the celestial poles stay at fixed points, perched on the horizon.

== See also ==
- Azimuth
- Astronomical coordinate systems
  - Astronomical coordinate systems § Converting coordinates
- Geocentric coordinates
- Horizon
- Vertical and horizontal
- Meridian (astronomy)
- Sextant
- Solar declination
- Spherical coordinate system
- Vertical circle
- Zenith
