= Apparent longitude =

Celestial coordinate system

Apparent longitude is celestial longitude corrected for aberration and nutation as opposed to mean longitude.

Apparent longitude is used in the definition of equinox and solstice. At equinox, the apparent geocentric celestial longitude of the Sun is 0° or 180°. At solstice, it is equal to 90° or 270°. This does not match up to declination exactly zero or declination extreme value because the celestial latitude of the Sun is (less than 1.2 arcseconds but) not zero.

== Sources ==
- United States Naval Observatory. Astronomical Almanac Glossary Chapter.
- Meeus, Jean. Astronomical Algorithms (Second ed.).
