= Naval Observatory Vector Astrometry Subroutines =

NOVAS
- Developer: United States Naval Observatory
- Stable release: C3.1 (C version); F3.1 (Fortran version); Python Edition 3.1.1 / March 31, 2011 (C); March 31, 2011 (FORTRAN); October 13, 2015 (Python)
- Written in: C/Fortran/Python
- Platform: Cross-platform (distributed in source code form)
- Type: Astrometry
- Website: aa.usno.navy.mil/software/novas/novas_info.php

The Naval Observatory Vector Astrometry Software (NOVAS) is a software library for astrometry-related numerical computations. It is developed by the Astronomical Applications Department, United States Naval Observatory. Currently, NOVAS has three different editions, for C, Fortran, and Python.

== Algorithms ==
The algorithms used by NOVAS are based on vector astrometry theories and the IAU resolutions. Instead of using trigonometric formulae from spherical astrometry, NOVAS uses the matrix and vector formulation which is more rigorous. This version implements the resolutions on astronomical reference systems and Earth rotation models passed at the IAU General Assemblies in 1997, 2000, and 2006. According to the Astronomical Applications Department, the algorithms used in NOVAS are identical to those used in the production of the US part of the Astronomical Almanac.

A detailed description of the algorithms can be found here: Kaplan, et al. (1989) Astron. J. 97, 1197.

== Structure ==
The NOVAS library provides three levels of subroutines (functions): basic, utility, and supervisory. Basic-level subroutines supply the values of fundamental variables, such as the nutation angles and the heliocentric positions of Solar System bodies for specific epoches. Utility-level subroutines perform transformations, such as those caused by precession, nutation and aberration. Supervisory-level subroutines serve as interfaces to the basic and utility subroutines to compute the coordinates of stars or Solar System bodies for specific dates and times.

== Usage ==
The NOVAS library can be linked by programs that work with positions of celestial bodies. For example, "Pocket Stars", an astronomy software for Smartphone and PDA platforms, used the NOVAS as its astrometry engine.

The Python edition allows calling the NOVAS functions from Python. It is mostly feature complete with respect to the C edition, with a few exceptions, and shares the C edition's API. The current edition uses Python's foreign function library, ctypes.

== Current status ==
Future versions of the Python interface will add support for passing data via NumPy types (and therefore support vectorized operations), and present a more Pythonic interface.

== Forks ==
SuperNOVAS is a fork of NOVAS C 3.1, maintained by Attila Kovács at the Center for Astrophysics | Harvard & Smithsonian since 2024. It aims to be a successor of NOVAS for C/C++, providing continued development, bug fixes, new features, improved usability, thread safety, and online documentation. The SuperNOVAS source code and releases are also available at https://github.com/Smithsonian/SuperNOVAS.

== See also ==
- Standards of Fundamental Astronomy
