= Department of Financial Services =

Department of Financial Services may refer to:

- New York State Department of Financial Services (DFS or NYSDFS), responsible for regulating financial services and products
- Florida Department of Financial Services (FLDFS), a state agency of Florida
- Department of Financial Services, of the Ministry of Finance (India)

== See also ==
- Michigan Department of Insurance and Financial Services (DIFS)
- DFS (disambiguation)
