= Galactic coordinate system =

Celestial coordinate system in spherical coordinates, with the Sun as its center

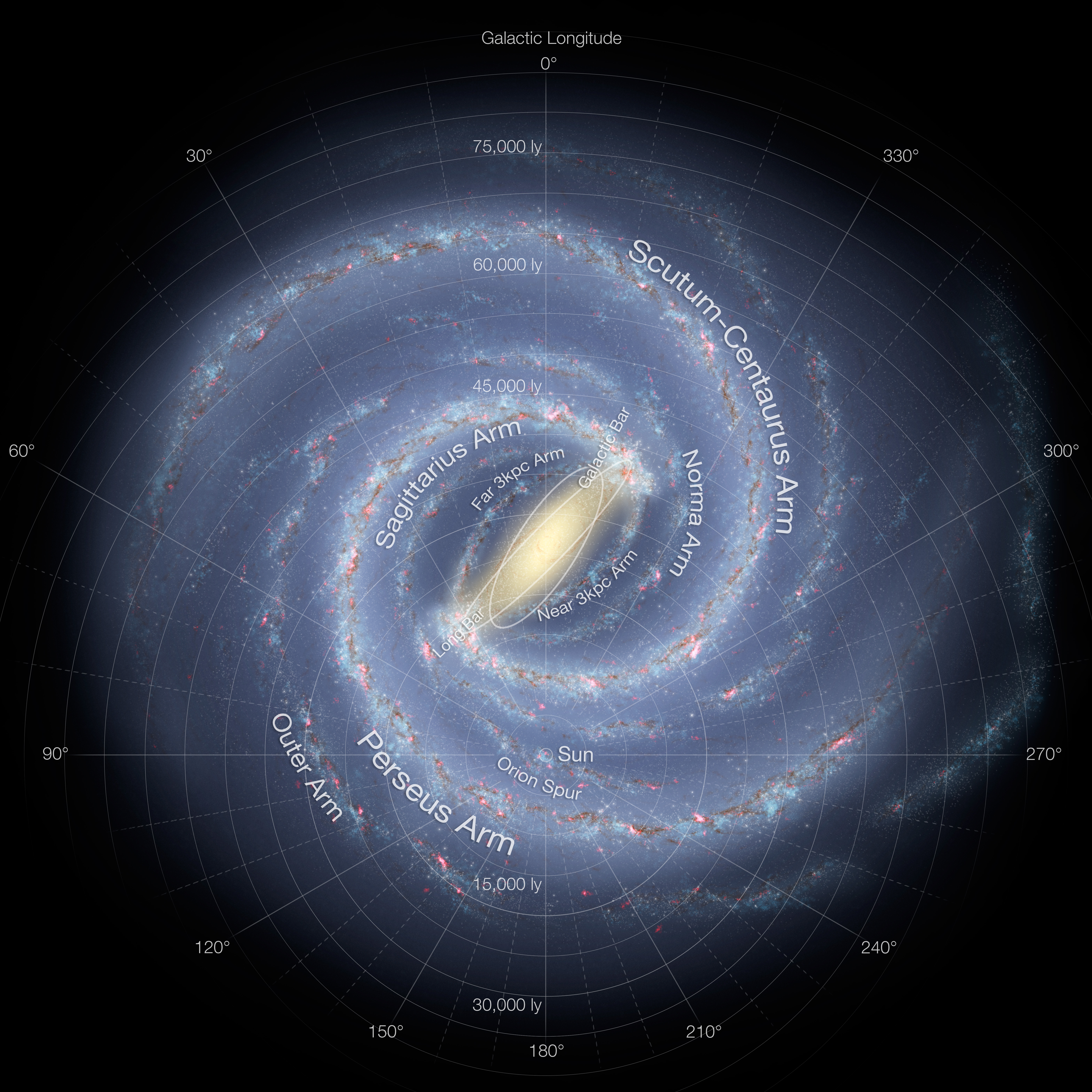
An artistic depiction of the Milky Way Galaxy showing the origin and orientation of galactic longitude. The galactic longitude (l) runs from the Sun upwards in the image through the center of the galaxy. The galactic latitude (b) is perpendicular to the image (i.e. coming out of the image) and also centered on the Sun.

The galactic coordinate system (GCS) is a celestial coordinate system in spherical coordinates, with the Sun as its center, the primary direction aligned with the approximate center of the Milky Way Galaxy, and the fundamental plane parallel to an approximation of the galactic plane but offset to its north. It uses the right-handed convention, meaning that coordinates are positive toward the north and toward the east in the fundamental plane.

== Spherical coordinates ==
=== Galactic longitude ===
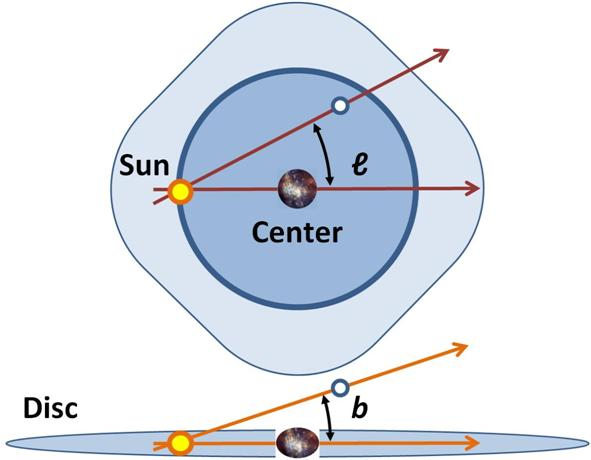
The galactic coordinates use the Sun as the origin. Galactic longitude (l) is measured with primary direction from the Sun to the center of the galaxy in the galactic plane, while the galactic latitude (b) measures the angle of the object above the galactic plane.

Longitude (symbol l) measures the angular distance of an object eastward along the galactic equator from the Galactic Center. Analogous to terrestrial longitude, galactic longitude is usually measured in degrees (°).

=== Galactic latitude ===
Latitude (symbol b) measures the angle of an object northward of the galactic equator (or midplane) as viewed from Earth. Analogous to terrestrial latitude, galactic latitude is usually measured in degrees.

== Definition ==
The first galactic coordinate system was used by William Herschel in 1785. A number of different coordinate systems, each differing by a few degrees, were used until 1932, when Lund Observatory assembled a set of conversion tables that defined a standard galactic coordinate system based on a galactic north pole at RA 12^{h} 40^{m}, dec +28° (in the B1900.0 epoch convention) and a 0° longitude at the point where the galactic plane and equatorial plane intersected.

In 1958, the International Astronomical Union (IAU) defined the galactic coordinate system in reference to radio observations of galactic neutral hydrogen through the hydrogen line, changing the definition of the Galactic longitude by 32° and the latitude by 1.5°. In the equatorial coordinate system, for equinox and equator of 1950.0, the north galactic pole is defined at right ascension 12^{h} 49^{m}, declination +27.4°, in the constellation Coma Berenices, with a probable error of ±0.1°. Longitude 0° is the great semicircle that originates from this point along the line in position angle 123° with respect to the equatorial pole. The galactic longitude increases in the same direction as right ascension. Galactic latitude is positive towards the north galactic pole, with a plane passing through the Sun and parallel to the galactic equator being 0°, whilst the poles are ±90°. Based on this definition, the galactic poles and equator can be found from spherical trigonometry and can be precessed to other epochs; see the table.

J2000.0 equatorial coordinates approximating the galactic reference points
	Right ascension	Declination	Constellation
North Pole +90° latitude	12^{h} 51.4^{m}	+27.13°	Coma Berenices (near 31 Com)
South Pole −90° latitude	0^{h} 51.4^{m}	−27.13°	Sculptor (near NGC 288)
Center; 0° longitude	17^{h} 45.6^{m}	−28.94°	Sagittarius (in Sagittarius A)
Anticenter; 180° longitude	5^{h} 45.6^{m}	+28.94°	Auriga (near HIP 27180)
Galactic north / Galactic south / Galactic center

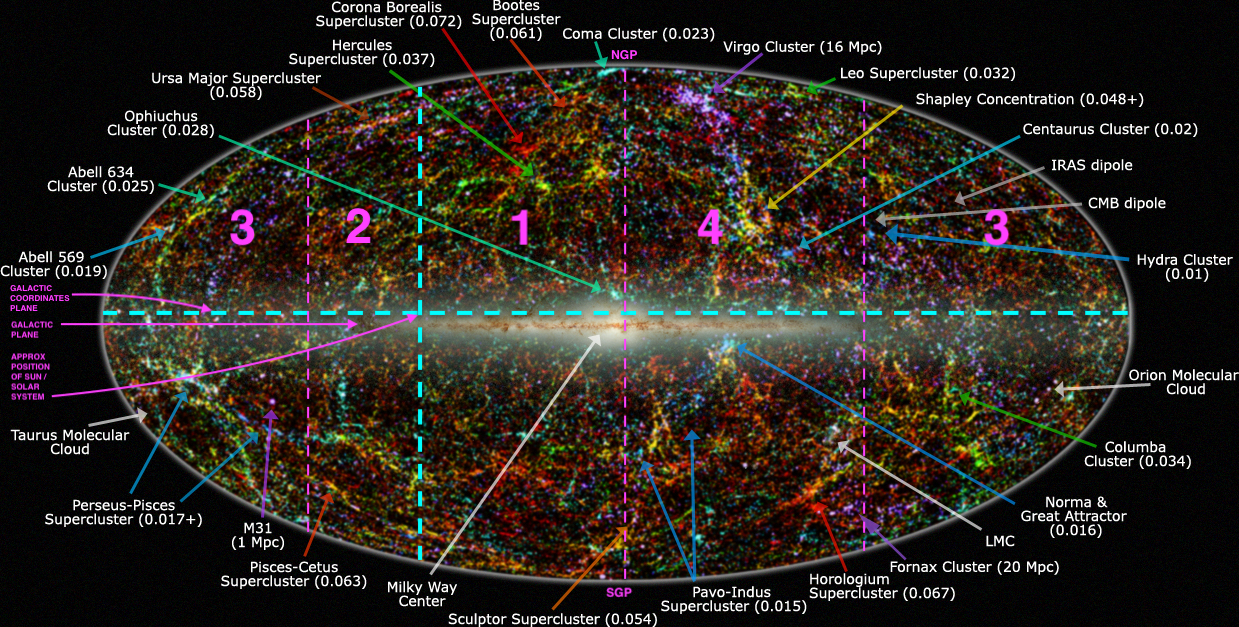
Approx galactic quadrants (NGQ/SGQ, 1–4) indicated, along with differentiating Galactic Plane (containing the Galactic Center) and the Galactic Coordinates Plane (containing the Sun / Solar System)

The IAU recommended that during the transition period from the old, pre-1958 system to the new, the old longitude and latitude should be designated l^{I} and b^{I} while the new should be designated l^{II} and b^{II}. This convention is occasionally seen.

Radio source Sagittarius A*, which is the best physical marker of the true Galactic Center, is located at 17^{h} 45^{m} 40.0409^{s}, −29° 00′ 28.118″ (J2000). Rounded to the same number of digits as the table, 17^{h} 45.7^{m}, −29.01° (J2000), there is an offset of about 0.07° from the defined coordinate center, well within the 1958 error estimate of ±0.1°. Due to the Sun's position, which currently lies 56.75±6.20 ly north of the midplane, and the heliocentric definition adopted by the IAU, the galactic coordinates of Sgr A* are latitude -0° 07′ 12″, longitude +0° 04′ 06″. Since as defined the galactic coordinate system does not rotate with time, Sgr A* is actually decreasing in longitude at the rate of galactic rotation at the sun, Ω, approximately 5.7 milliarcseconds per year (see Oort constants).

== Conversion between equatorial and galactic coordinates ==
An object's location expressed in the equatorial coordinate system can be transformed into the galactic coordinate system. In these equations, α is right ascension, δ is declination. NGP refers to the coordinate values of the north galactic pole and NCP to those of the north celestial pole.

$$\begin{align}
\sin(b) &= \sin(\delta_\text{NGP})\sin(\delta)+\cos(\delta_\text{NGP})\cos(\delta)\cos(\alpha-\alpha_\text{NGP}) \\
\cos(b) \sin(l_\text{NCP}-l) &= \cos(\delta)\sin(\alpha-\alpha_\text{NGP}) \\
\cos(b) \cos(l_\text{NCP}-l) &= \cos(\delta_\text{NGP}) \sin(\delta) - \sin(\delta_\text{NGP}) \cos(\delta) \cos(\alpha - \alpha_\text{NGP})
\end{align}$$

The reverse (galactic to equatorial) can also be accomplished with the following conversion formulas.
$$\begin{align}
\sin (\delta) &= \sin (\delta_\text{NGP}) \sin(b) + \cos (\delta_\text{NGP}) \cos(b) \cos(l_\text{NCP} - l) \\
\cos (\delta) \sin(\alpha - \alpha_\text{NGP}) &= \cos(b) \sin(l_\text{NCP} - l) \\
\cos (\delta) \cos(\alpha - \alpha_\text{NGP}) &= \cos (\delta_\text{NGP}) \sin(b) - \sin(\delta_\text{NGP}) \cos(b) \cos(l_\text{NCP} - l)
\end{align}$$

Where:

$$\alpha_\text{NGP}=12^h 51.4^m \qquad \delta_\text{NGP}=27.13^{\circ} \qquad l_\text{NCP}=122.93314^{\circ}$$

== Rectangular coordinates ==
In some applications use is made of rectangular coordinates based on galactic longitude and latitude and distance. In some work regarding the distant past or future the galactic coordinate system is taken as rotating so that the x-axis always goes to the centre of the galaxy.

There are two major rectangular variations of galactic coordinates, commonly used for computing space velocities of galactic objects. In these systems the xyz-axes are designated UVW, but the definitions vary by author. In one system, the U axis is directed toward the Galactic Center (l = 0°), and it is a right-handed system (positive towards the east and towards the north galactic pole); in the other, the U axis is directed toward the galactic anticenter (l = 180°), and it is a left-handed system (positive towards the east and towards the north galactic pole).

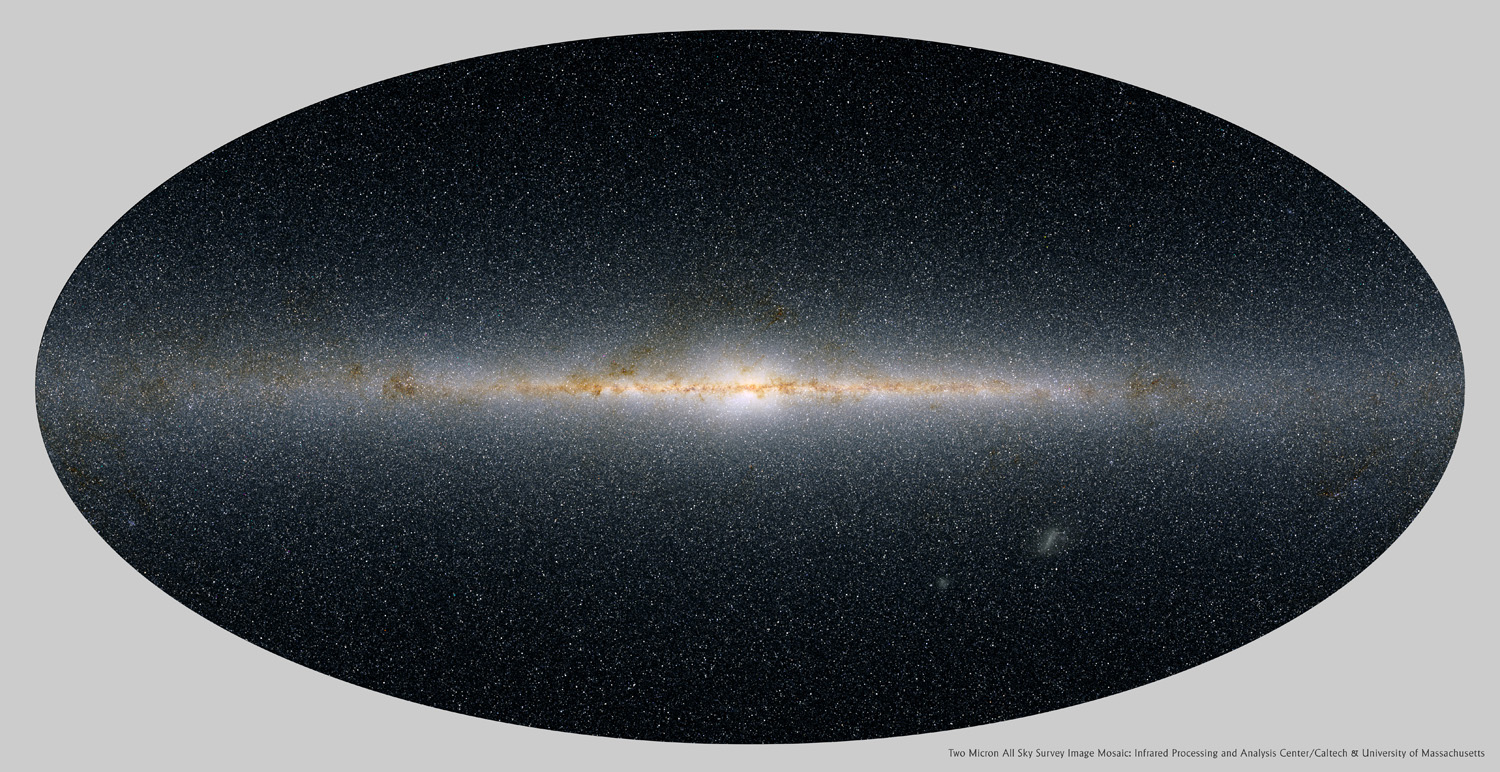
The anisotropy of the star density in the night sky makes the galactic coordinate system very useful for coordinating surveys, both those that require high densities of stars at low galactic latitudes, and those that require a low density of stars at high galactic latitudes. For this image the Mollweide projection has been applied, typical in maps using galactic coordinates.

== In the constellations ==
The galactic equator runs through the following constellations:

- Sagittarius
- Serpens
- Scutum
- Aquila
- Sagitta
- Vulpecula
- Cygnus
- Cepheus
- Cassiopeia
- Camelopardalis
- Perseus
- Auriga
- Taurus
- Gemini
- Orion
- Monoceros
- Canis Major
- Puppis
- Vela
- Carina
- Crux
- Centaurus
- Circinus
- Norma
- Ara
- Scorpius
- Ophiuchus

== See also ==
- Galactic quadrant – One of four circular sectors of the Milky Way galaxy
- Supergalactic coordinate system – Astronomical coordinate system
- Astronomical coordinate systems – System for specifying positions of celestial objects
- Galaxy formation and evolution – Subfield of cosmology
- Milky Way – Galaxy containing the Solar System
