= 31 Comae Berenices =

Star in the constellation Coma Berenices

- Location of 31 Comae Berenices (circled in red)

Observation data Epoch J2000 Equinox ICRS
- Constellation: Coma Berenices
- Right ascension: 12^{h} 51^{m} 41.91900^{s}
- Declination: +27° 32′ 26.5683″
- Apparent magnitude (V): 4.87 - 4.97

Characteristics
- Evolutionary stage: Subgiant
- Spectral type: G0III
- Variable type: FK Com

Astrometry
Proper motion (μ)	RA: −10.990 mas/yr Dec.: −8.313 mas/yr
Parallax (π)	11.4933±0.1828 mas
Distance	284 ± 5 ly (87 ± 1 pc)
Absolute magnitude (M_{V})	_0.05

Details
Mass	2.2 M_{☉}
Radius	8.9 R_{☉}
Luminosity	74 L_{☉}
Surface gravity (log g)	3.51 cgs
Temperature	5,660 K
Metallicity [Fe/H]	−0.15 dex
Rotation	6.8 d
Rotational velocity (v sin i)	67 km/s
Age	540 Myr

Other designations
- 31 Com, LS Comae Berenices, BD+28°2156, FK5 1332, HD 111812, HIP 62763, HR 4883, SAO 82537

Database references
SIMBAD	data

31 Comae Berenices (31 Com) is a yellow giant star in the constellation Coma Berenices. Its apparent magnitude is about 4.9 and slightly variable. It is visible to the naked eye. In 1997, Klaus G. Strassmeier et al. announced their discovery that the star is a variable star. It was given its variable star designation, LS Comae Berenices, in 2003. It is a rare FK Comae Berenices variable, a variable star that spins rapidly and has large starspots on its surface. It is currently in the Hertzsprung gap and its outer envelope has just begun convection. In 1989 it was given as a spectral standard for the class G0IIIp.

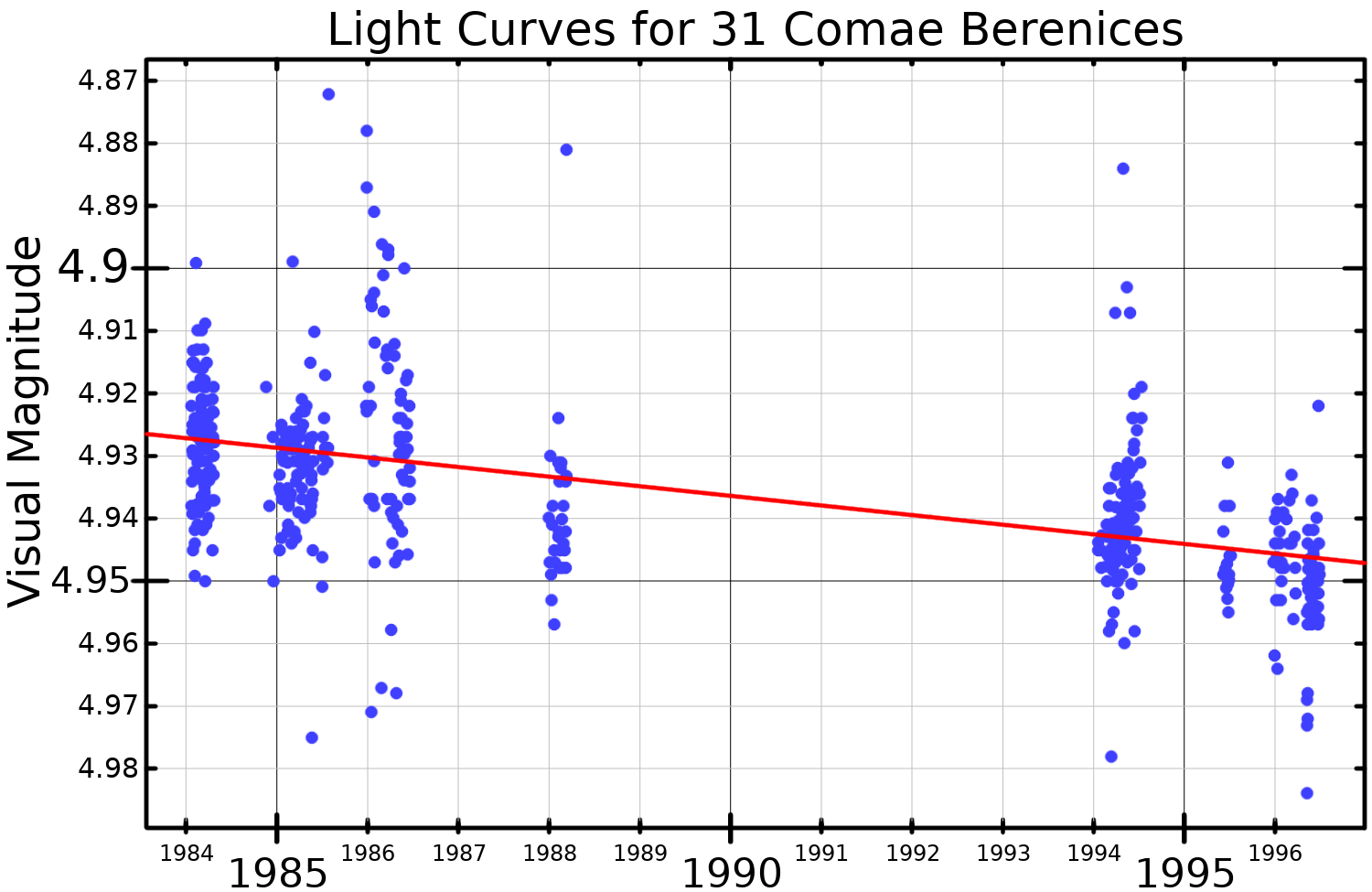
A visual band light curve for 31 Comae Berenices, adapted from Strassmeier et al. (1997). The red line shows the linear least squares fit to the data.

31 Com is the north galactic pole star, and occasionally goes by the informal name Polaris Galacticum Borealis, coined by Jim Kaler.

In Chinese astronomy, 31 Comae Berenices is called 郎將, Pinyin: Lángjiāng, meaning Captain of the Bodyguards, because this star is marking itself and stand alone in Captain of the Bodyguards asterism, Supreme Palace enclosure mansion (see: Chinese constellation).
