= Barycentric and geocentric celestial reference systems =

Celestial coordinate system

The barycentric celestial reference system (BCRS) is a coordinate system used in astrometry to specify the location and motions of astronomical objects. Its center of coordinates as the center of mass of the entire Solar System, its barycenter. It was created in 2000 by the International Astronomical Union (IAU) to be the global standard reference system for objects located outside the gravitational vicinity of Earth: planets, moons, and other Solar System bodies, stars and other objects in the Milky Way galaxy, and extra-galactic objects.

The geocentric celestial reference system (GCRS), also created by the IAU in 2000, is a similar standard coordinate system used to specify the location and motions of near-Earth objects, such as satellites. Its center of coordinates is the center of mass of the Earth.

These systems make it easier for scientists and engineers to compile, share, compare, and convert accurate measurements worldwide, by establishing standards both of measure and of methodology, and providing a consistent framework of operations. The focus of the BCRS is on astronomy: exploration of the Solar System and the universe. The BCRS is the system currently used for expressing positional data in astronomical references, such as the Hipparcos star catalog.

The focus of the GCRS is somewhat more on the navigation of Earth satellites and the geophysical applications they support. The proper functioning of the Global Positioning System (GPS) is directly dependent upon the accuracy of satellite measurements as supported by the GCRS.

== Purpose and implementation ==
The BCRS was designed to support the extremely-high-precision measurements of position and motion required in astrometry. One critical factor in achieving that precision lies in how general relativistic effects are determined and measured. Both systems incorporate standards that enable the consistency and ready comparability of the resulting spacetime coordinates among astrometric measurements taken worldwide. They provide a metric tensor to establish a consistent frame of reference for observations. The tensor achieves consistency in part through its standardization of the reference point for gravity.

The geocentric system is simpler, being smaller and involving few massive objects: that coordinate system defines its center as the center of mass of the Earth itself. The barycentric system can be loosely thought of as being centered on the Sun, but the Solar System is more complicated. Even the much smaller planets exert gravitational force upon the Sun, causing it to shift position slightly as they orbit. Those shifts are very large in comparison to the measurement precisions that are required for astrometry. Thus, the BCRS defines its center of coordinates as the center of mass of the entire Solar System, its barycenter. This stable point for gravity helps to minimize relativistic effects from any observational frames of reference within the Solar System.

== Relationship to other standards ==
=== ICRS ===
The orientation of the BCRS coordinate system coincides with that of the International Celestial Reference System (ICRS). Both are centered at the barycenter of the Solar System, and both "point" in the same direction. That is, their axes are aligned with that of the International Celestial Reference Frame (ICRF), which was adopted as a standard by the IAU two years earlier (1998). The motivation of the ICRF is to define what "direction" means in space, by fixing its orientation in relation to the Celestial sphere, that is, to deep-space background. Speaking casually, it does not move in relation to the stars and galaxies; it does not rotate.

Determining perfect immobilization of direction is not possible in practice, but we can get much closer than it is even possible for us to measure. The more distant an object is, the less its direction appears to move in relation to us (the parallax effect). The ICRF thus uses very distant objects, well outside our galaxy, to establish its directional points of reference. The chosen objects also emit radio wavelengths, which are less subject than other wavelengths to being obscured by celestial gas in front of them. The ICRF adopts coordinates for 212 defining objects, mostly quasars, fixing its orientation with respect to them.

=== HCRF ===
The Hipparcos Celestial Reference Frame (HCRF) was similar to ICRF, but earlier, used in association with the Hipparcos satellite, which functioned between 1989 and 1993. That satellite took copious stellar parallax measurements at accuracies exceeding anything otherwise available at the time, thus producing a catalog of stars still in wide use today. No such extensive mapping has yet been completed based upon subsequent improvements in measurement capability. With lower precision then, and at optical wavelengths, the ICRS and BCRS can also be specified using the HCRF. That is the means by which BCRS can be used in relation to the Hipparcos star catalog.

== Conversion of coordinates ==
The BCRS and GCRS were also designed so as to make transformations of their coordinates between themselves and other reference systems possible, though the conversions are not by any means straightforward. There are two software libraries of IAU-sanctioned algorithms for manipulating and transforming among the BCRS and other reference systems: the Standards of Fundamental Astronomy (SOFA) system and the Naval Observatory Vector Astrometry Subroutines (NOVAS).

The orientation of the BCRS/ICRS axes also align within 0.02 arcsecond of the Earth's mean equator and equinox for the Fifth Fundamental Catalog (FK5) J2000.0 epoch.

== See also ==
- Barycentric Coordinate Time
- Geocentric Coordinate Time
- Earth-centered inertial
- Gaia Celestial Reference Frame
- Topocentric coordinates
