= Double Fourier sphere method =

Mathematical technique

In mathematics, the double Fourier sphere (DFS) method is a technique that transforms a function defined on the surface of the sphere to a function defined on a rectangular domain while preserving periodicity in both the longitude and latitude directions.

== Introduction ==
First, a function $f(x, y, z)$ on the sphere is written as $f(\lambda,\theta)$ using spherical coordinates, i.e.,

$$f(\lambda,\theta) = f(\cos\lambda\sin\theta,\sin\lambda\sin\theta, \cos\theta),  (\lambda,\theta)\in[-\pi,\pi]\times[0,\pi].$$

The function $f(\lambda, \theta)$ is $2\pi$-periodic in $\lambda$, but not periodic in $\theta$. The periodicity in the latitude direction has been lost. To recover it, the function is "doubled up” and a related function on $[-\pi,\pi]\times[-\pi,\pi]$ is defined as

$$\tilde{f}(\lambda,\theta) = \begin{cases}
g(\lambda + \pi, \theta), & (\lambda, \theta) \in [-\pi, 0] \times [0, \pi],\\
h(\lambda, \theta), &(\lambda, \theta) \in [0, \pi] \times [0, \pi],\\
g(\lambda, -\theta), &(\lambda, \theta) \in [0, \pi] \times [-\pi, 0],\\
h(\lambda + \pi, -\theta), & (\lambda, \theta) \in [-\pi, 0] \times [-\pi, 0],\\
\end{cases}$$

where $g(\lambda, \theta) = f(\lambda- \pi, \theta)$ and $h(\lambda, \theta) = f(\lambda, \theta)$ for $(\lambda, \theta) \in[0, \pi] \times [0, \pi]$. The new function $\tilde{f}$ is $2\pi$-periodic in $\lambda$ and $\theta$, and is constant along the lines $\theta = 0$ and $\theta = \pm\pi$, corresponding to the poles.

The function $\tilde{f}$ can be expanded into a double Fourier series

$$\tilde{f} \approx \sum_{j=-n}^n \sum_{k=-n}^n a_{jk} e^{ij\theta}e^{ik\lambda}$$

== History ==
The DFS method was proposed by Merilees and developed further by Steven Orszag. The DFS method has been the subject of relatively few investigations since (a notable exception is Fornberg's work), perhaps due to the dominance of spherical harmonics expansions. Over the last fifteen years it has begun to be used for the computation of gravitational fields near black holes and to novel space-time spectral analysis.
