= Standards of Fundamental Astronomy =

Astronomy software

- Stable release: 2023-10-11 / 2023-10-11
- Written in: C and Fortran
- Operating system: Cross-platform
- Type: Numerical library
- License: SOFA Software License
- Website: http://www.iausofa.org/

The Standards of Fundamental Astronomy (SOFA) software libraries are a collection of subroutines that implement official International Astronomical Union (IAU) algorithms for astronomical computations.

As of February 2009 they are available in both Fortran and C source code format.

== Capabilities ==
The subroutines in the libraries cover the following areas:

- Calendars
- Time scales
- Earth's rotation and sidereal time
- Ephemerides (limited precision)
- Precession, nutation, polar motion
- Proper motion
- Star catalog conversions
- Astrometric transformations
- Galactic Coordinates

== Licensing ==
As of the February 2009 release, SOFA licensing changed to allow use for any purpose, provided certain requirements are met. Previously, commercial usage was specifically excluded and required written agreement of the SOFA board.

== See also ==
- Naval Observatory Vector Astrometry Subroutines
- List of open-source mathematical libraries
