= Demand Flexibility Service =

UK demand response system

The Demand Flexibility Service (DFS) is a demand response system in the United Kingdom that was launched in January 2023, and ran until March 2023. Operated by National Grid, the service allows electricity system operators in England, Scotland and Wales to access additional flexibility in the providing of power when demand is high, such as on winter days when outside temperatures are cold, and still air means less electricity is generated through wind power. The scheme was launched following the global energy crisis as energy prices experienced a sharp increase, and is designed to reward both domestic and some commercial customers with a smart meter by offering them discounts on their energy bills for using less energy at specific times. The scheme involves 26 of the UK's energy providers. Following a series of experiments during late 2022, the scheme's first national application occurred at 5pm on 23 January 2023, when customers were asked to use less energy for an hour. The scheme took place for a second time the following day. Media, including BBC News, reported that householders would be paid around £10 per time for saving electricity.
