= Orbital plane of reference =

Plane used to define orbital elements

In celestial mechanics, the orbital plane of reference (or orbital reference plane) is the plane used to define orbital elements (positions). The two main orbital elements that are measured with respect to the plane of reference are the inclination and the longitude of the ascending node.

Depending on the type of body being described, there are four different kinds of reference planes that are typically used:

- The ecliptic or invariable plane for planets, asteroids, comets, etc. within the Solar System, as these bodies generally have orbits that lie close to the ecliptic.
- The equatorial plane of the orbited body for satellites orbiting with small semi-major axes
- The local Laplace plane for satellites orbiting with intermediate-to-large semi-major axes
- The plane tangent to celestial sphere for extrasolar objects

On the plane of reference, a zero-point must be defined from which the angles of longitude are measured. This is usually defined as the point on the celestial sphere where the plane crosses the prime hour circle (the hour circle occupied by the First Point of Aries), also known as the equinox.

== See also ==
- Fundamental plane
- Plane (geometry)
