= True north =

Direction on Earth's surface

True north is the direction along Earth's surface towards the place where the imaginary rotational axis of the Earth intersects the surface of the Earth on its northern half, the True North Pole. True south is the direction opposite to the true north.

It is important to make the distinction from magnetic north, which points towards an ever changing location close to the True North Pole determined by Earth's magnetic field. Due to fundamental limitations in map projection, true north also differs from the grid north which is marked by the direction of the grid lines on a typical printed map. However, the longitude lines on a globe leads to the true poles, because the three-dimensional representation avoids those limitations.

The celestial pole is the location on the imaginary celestial sphere where an imaginary extension of the rotational axis of the Earth intersects the celestial sphere. Within a margin of error of 1°, the true north direction can be approximated by the position of the pole star Polaris which would currently appear to be very close to the intersection, tracing a tiny circle in the sky each sidereal day. Due to the axial precession of Earth, true north rotates in an arc with respect to the stars that takes approximately 25,000 years to complete. Around 2101–2103, Polaris will make its closest approach to the celestial north pole (extrapolated from recent Earth precession). The visible star nearest the north celestial pole 5,000 years ago was Thuban. The radius of the circle traced out by the north pole in the sky over the 25,000 year cycle is 23.5°.

On maps published by the United States Geological Survey (USGS) and the United States Armed Forces, true north is marked with a line terminating in a five-pointed star. The east and west edges of the USGS topographic quadrangle maps of the United States are meridians of longitude, thus indicating true north (so they are not exactly parallel). Maps issued by the United Kingdom Ordnance Survey contain a diagram showing the difference between true north, grid north, and magnetic north at a point on the sheet; the edges of the map are likely to follow grid directions rather than true, and the map will thus be truly rectangular/square.

== Sources ==
- McClure, Bruce (2013). "Polaris is the North Star". Astronomy Essentials. EarthSky. Archived from the original on 2014-03-09.
- Meeus, Jean (1997). Mathematical Astronomy Morsels. Richmond, VA: Willmann-Bell. ISBN 0-943396-51-4.
- Ridpath, Ian, ed. (2004). Norton's Star Atlas. New York: Pearson Education. ISBN 0-13-145164-2.
- Smiley, C. H.; Khan, A. Majid (1959). "Polaris and Precession". Journal of the Royal Astronomical Society of Canada. 53: 249. Bibcode:1959JRASC..53..249S.
