= Celestial equator =

Projection of Earth's equator out into space

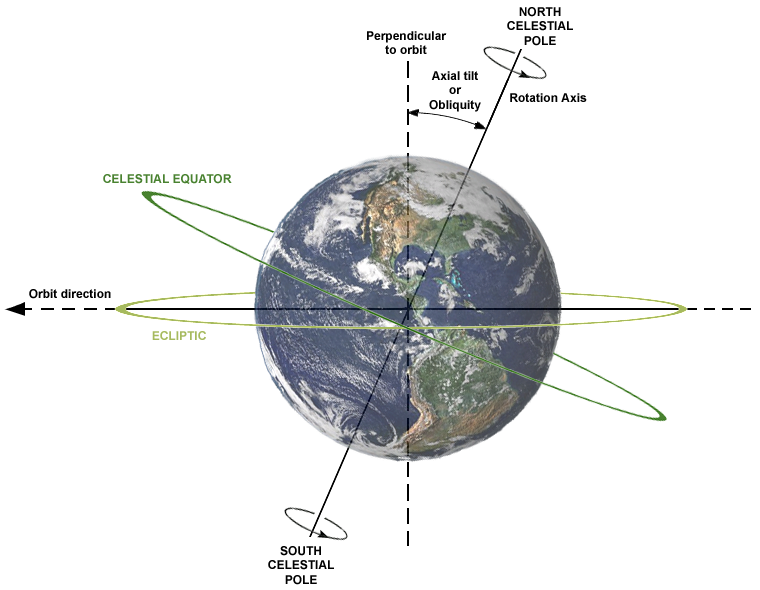
The celestial equator is currently inclined by about 23.44° to the ecliptic plane. The image shows the relations between Earth's axial tilt (or obliquity), rotation axis, and orbital plane.

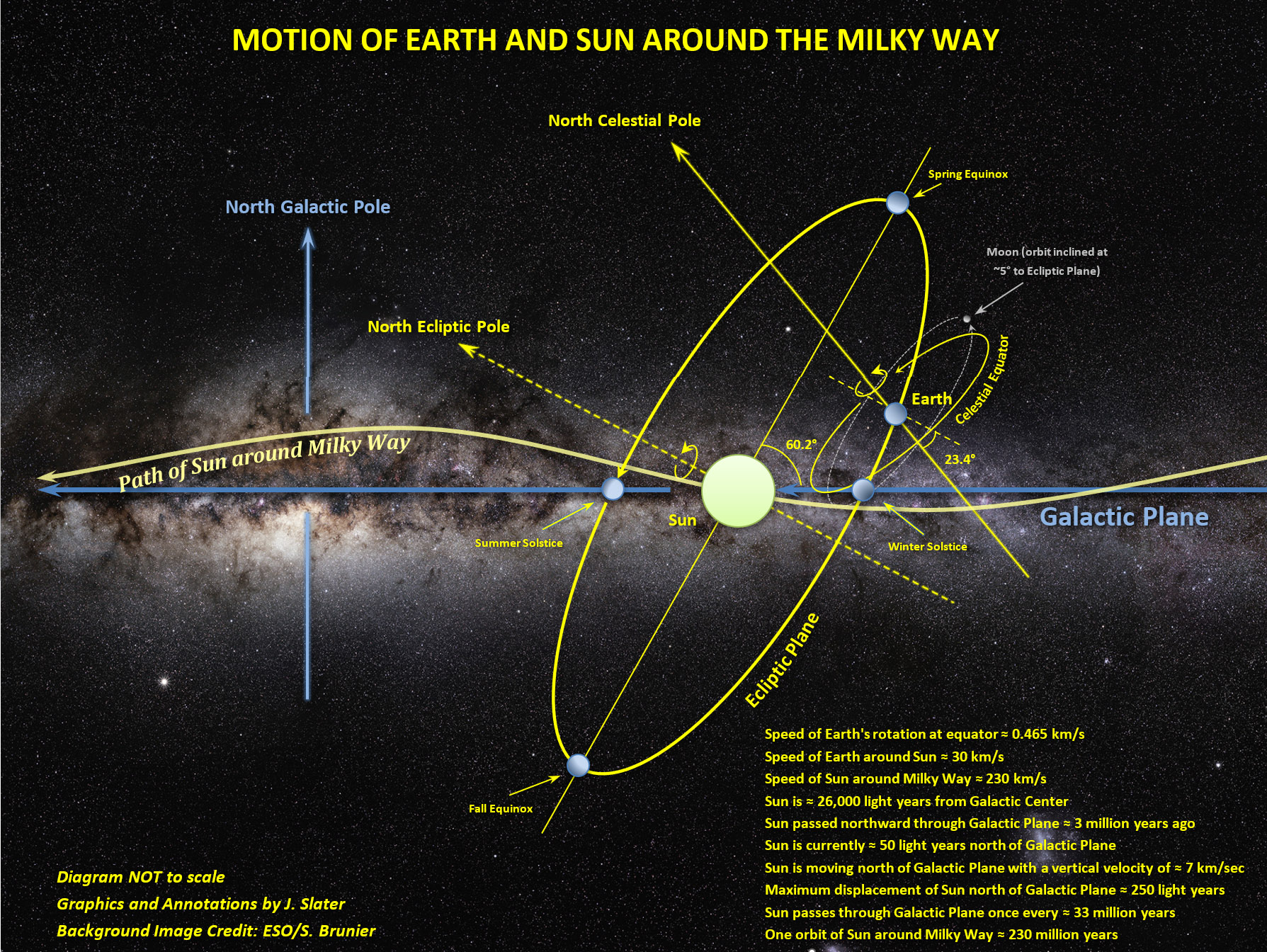
Celestial equator in relation to the galactic and ecliptic planes

The celestial equator is the great circle of the imaginary celestial sphere on the same plane as the equator of a planet, by convention generally Earth. By extension, it is also a plane of reference in the equatorial coordinate system. Because of the Earth's axial tilt, the celestial equator is currently inclined by about 23.44° with respect to the ecliptic (the plane of Earth's orbit), but has varied from about 22.0° to 24.5° over the past 5 million years as a result of Milankovitch cycles and perturbation from other planets.

An observer standing on the Earth's equator visualizes the celestial equator as a semicircle passing through the zenith, the point directly overhead. As the observer moves north (or south), the celestial equator tilts towards the opposite horizon. The celestial equator is defined to be of infinite reach (since it is on the celestial sphere); thus, the ends of the semicircle always intersect the horizon due east and due west, regardless of the observer's position on the Earth. At the poles, the celestial equator coincides with the astronomical horizon. At all latitudes, the celestial equator is a uniform arc or circle because the observer is only finitely far from the plane of the celestial equator, but infinitely far from the edge of the celestial equator itself.

Astronomical objects near the celestial equator appear above the horizon from most places on the Earth, but they culminate highest near the equator. The celestial equator currently passes through these constellations:

- Pisces (contains the first point of Aries above its southern border)
- Cetus
- Taurus
- Eridanus
- Orion (near Orion's Belt)
- Monoceros
- Canis Minor
- Hydra
- Sextans
- Leo
- Virgo (contains the first point of Libra)
- Serpens (caput)
- Ophiuchus
- Serpens (cauda)
- Aquila
- Aquarius

Over thousands of years, the orientation of the Earth's equator and thus the constellations the celestial equator passes through will change due to axial precession.

Celestial bodies other than the Earth also have similarly defined celestial equators.

== See also ==
- Celestial pole
- Declination
- Rotation around a fixed axis (pole)
