= NGC 3172 =

Galaxy in the constellation Ursa Minor

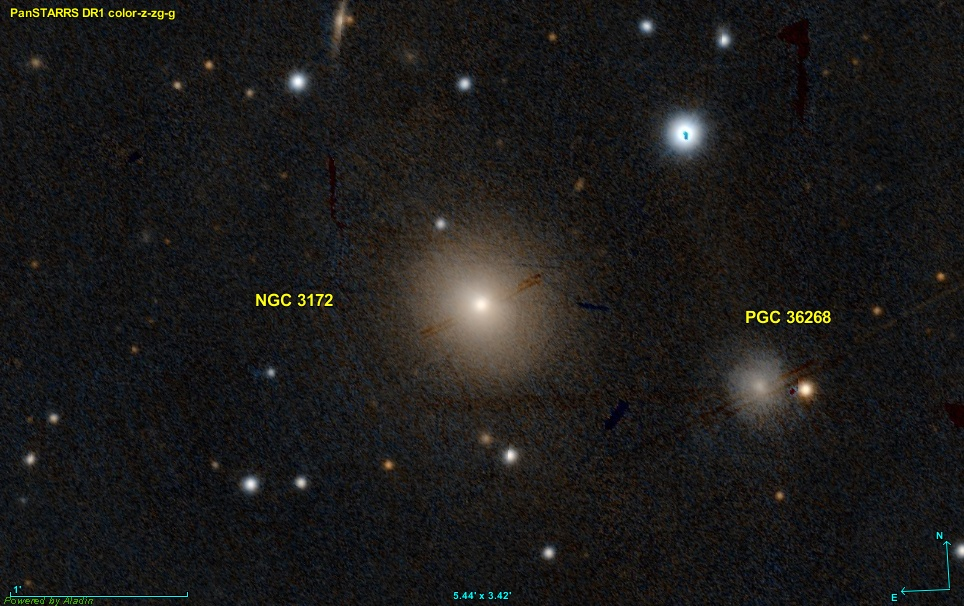
- NGC 3172 imaged by Pan-STARRS

Observation data (J2000 epoch)
- Constellation: Ursa Minor
- Right ascension: 11^{h} 47^{m} 11.928^{s}
- Declination: +89° 05′ 35.77″
- Redshift: 0.020334±0.0000970
- Heliocentric radial velocity: 6,096±29 km/s
- Distance: 291.4 ± 20.5 Mly (89.33 ± 6.28 Mpc)
- Apparent magnitude (V): 14.9

Characteristics
- Type: S0
- Apparent size (V): 0.92′ × 0.79′
- Notable features: Closest NGC object to the north celestial pole

Other designations
- MCG +15-01-011, PGC 36847, CGCG 370-002

NGC 3172 (also known as Polarissima Borealis) is a lenticular galaxy located in the constellation Ursa Minor. It is the closest NGC object to the north celestial pole. Discovered by John Herschel in 1831, it is about 285 million light-years away and about 85 thousand light-years across.

== Supernovae ==
Two supernovae have been observed in NGC 3172:

- SN 2010af (Type Ia, mag. 17.2), was discovered by Tom Boles on 4 March 2010.
- SN 2017gla (Type Ia, mag. 16), was discovered on by Giancarlo Cortini on 1 September 2017.

NGC 3172 imaged by the Hubble Space Telescope in narrowband IR, ~2000 seconds of integration, drizzled, colourized by Pan-STARRS color.

== See also ==
- NGC 2573 - the closest NGC object to the south celestial pole.
- List of NGC objects (3001–4000)
