= NGC 2573 =

Galaxy in the constellation Octans

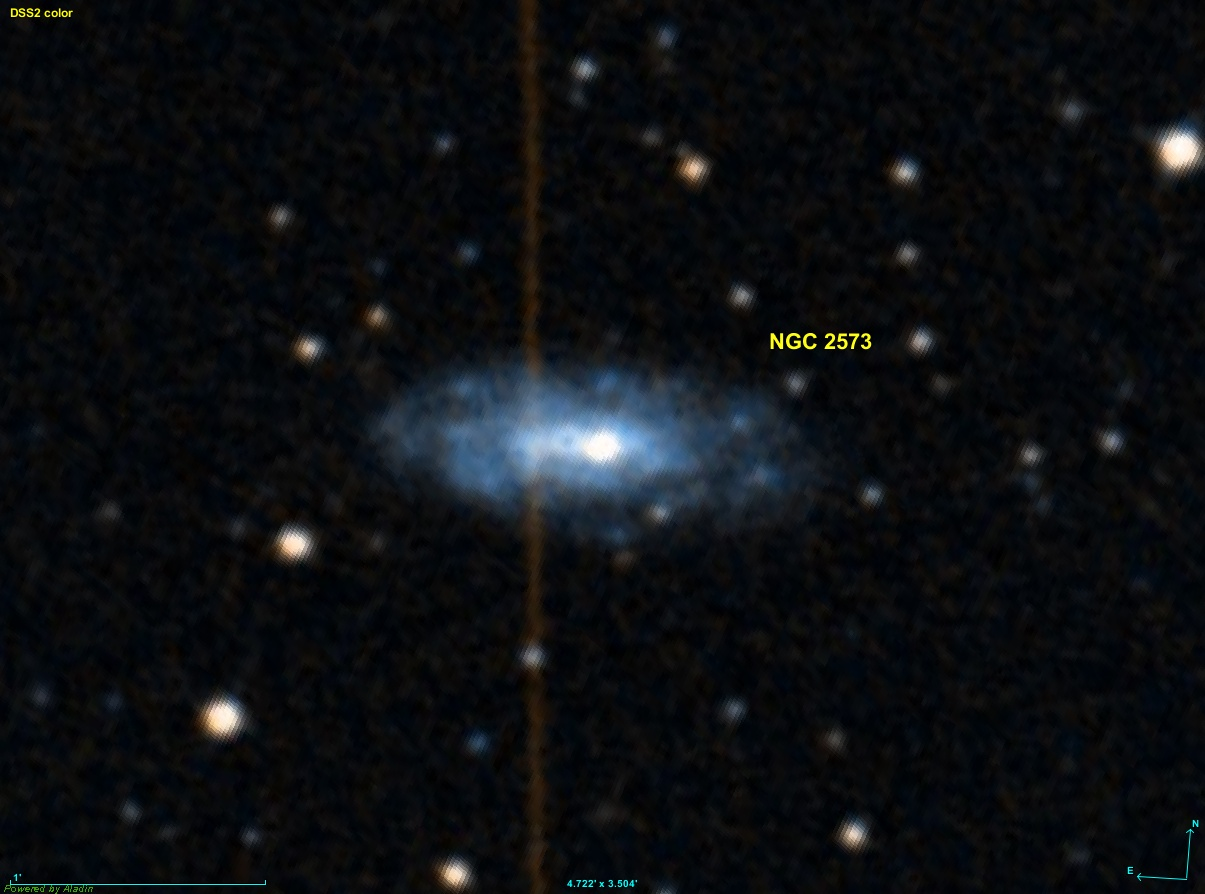
- NGC 2573

Observation data (J2000.0 epoch)
- Constellation: Octans
- Right ascension: 01^{h} 41^{m} 38.0019^{s}
- Declination: −89° 20′ 04.2723″
- Redshift: 0.008102±0.000017
- Heliocentric radial velocity: 2,429±5 km/s
- Distance: 25.8 megaparsecs (84 Mly)
- Apparent magnitude (V): 13.25±0.09
- Apparent magnitude (B): 14.15±0.09
- Absolute magnitude (V): −19.30±0.67

Characteristics
- Type: SAB(s)cd:
- Mass: 3.229×10^{11} M_{☉}
- Size: 23,860 parsecs (77,800 ly)
- Apparent size (V): 0.85′ × 0.34′
- Notable features: Closest NGC object to the south celestial pole.

Other designations
- Polarissima Australis,NGC 2573, PGC 6249

NGC 2573, also known as Polarissima Australis, is a barred spiral galaxy located in the constellation Octans. It has an apparent magnitude of 13.25, making it readily visible in medium-sized telescopes, but not to the naked eye. The object is located relatively far at a distance of 84 million light years and it is currently receding with a heliocentric radial velocity of 2495 km/s. Using a redshift of z = 0.08102 yields a greater distance of 109 million light years.

The galaxy was discovered on March 29th, 1837 by English astronomer John Herschel. It is the closest NGC object to the south celestial pole, hence the nickname "Polarissima Australis".

In the De Vaucouleurs system, NGC 2573 has a morphological classification of SAB(s)cd:, indicating that it is a weakly-barred spiral galaxy with loosely bound spiral arms and a small, faint bulge. The (s) notation indicates that the galaxy has a purely spiral structure. There is uncertainty about the classification, possibly due to NGC 2573's faintness. NGC 2573 is estimated to be 77,800 light years across, making it similar in size to the Milky Way. Alternatively, it has a central mass of 3.229×10^{11} M_{☉}, which is 28% of the latter's mass.

== See also ==
- NGC 3172 - the closest NGC object to the north celestial pole.
