= Hour circle =

Part of celestial coordinate system

Diagram illustrating the definition of the hour circle of a star

In astronomy, the hour circle is the great circle through a given object and the two celestial poles. Together with declination and distance (from the planet's centre of mass), it determines the location of any celestial object. As such, it is a higher concept than the meridian as defined in astronomy, which takes account of the terrain and depth to the centre of Earth at a ground observer's location. The hour circles, specifically, are perfect circles perpendicular (at right angles) to the celestial equator. By contrast, the declination of an object viewed on the celestial sphere is the angle of that object to/from the celestial equator (thus ranging from +90° to −90°).

The location of stars, planets, and other similarly distant objects is usually expressed in the following parameters, one for each of the three spatial dimensions: their declination, right ascension (epoch-fixed hour angle), and distance. These are as located at the vernal equinox for the epoch (e.g. J2000) stated.

A meridian on the celestial sphere matches an hour circle at any time. The hour circle is a subtype whereby it is expressed in hours as opposed to degrees, radians, or other units of angle. The hour circles make for easy prediction of the angle (and time due to Earth's fairly regular rotation, approximately equal to the time) between the observation of two objects at the same, or similar declination. The hour circles (meridians) are measured in hours (or hours, minutes, and seconds); one rotation (360°) is equivalent to 24 hours; 1 hour is equivalent to 15°.

An astronomical meridian follows the same concept and, almost precisely, the orientation of a meridian (also known as longitude) on a globe.

== See also ==
- Meridian (astronomy)
- Declination
