= Polar distance (astronomy) =

Celestial coordinate system

In the celestial equatorial coordinate system Σ(α, δ) in astronomy, polar distance (PD) is an angular distance of a celestial object on its meridian measured from the celestial pole, similar to the way declination (dec, δ) is measured from the celestial equator.

== Definition ==
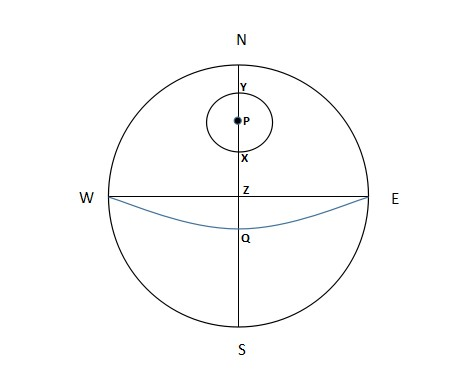

Polar distance in celestial navigation is the angle between the pole and the position of body on its declination.

Referring to diagram:

P- Pole, WQE- Equator, Z - Zenith of observer,

Y- Lower meridian passage of body

X- Upper meridian passage of body

Here body will be on declination circle (XY). The distance between PY or PX will be the Polar distance of the body.

NP=ZQ=Latitude of observer

NY and NX will be the True altitude of body at that instant.

Polar distance (PD) = 90° ± δ

Polar distances are expressed in degrees and cannot exceed 180° in magnitude. An object on the celestial equator has a PD of 90°.

Polar distance is affected by the precession of the equinoxes.

If the polar distance of the Sun is equal to the observer's latitude, the shadow path of a gnomon's tip on a sundial will be a parabola; at higher latitudes it will be an ellipse and lower, a hyperbola.
