= Polar distance =

Polar distance may refer to:

- Polar distance (astronomy), an astronomical term associated with the celestial equatorial coordinate system Σ(α, δ)ellipse and lower, a hyperbola
- Polar distance (geometry), more correctly called radial distance, typically denoted r, a coordinate in polar coordinate systems (r, θ)
- Polar distance (botany) is used in the classification of pollens
- Polar distance (geodesy), the length of the meridian quadrant from the equator to the pole
