= Orbital pole =

Celestial coordinate system

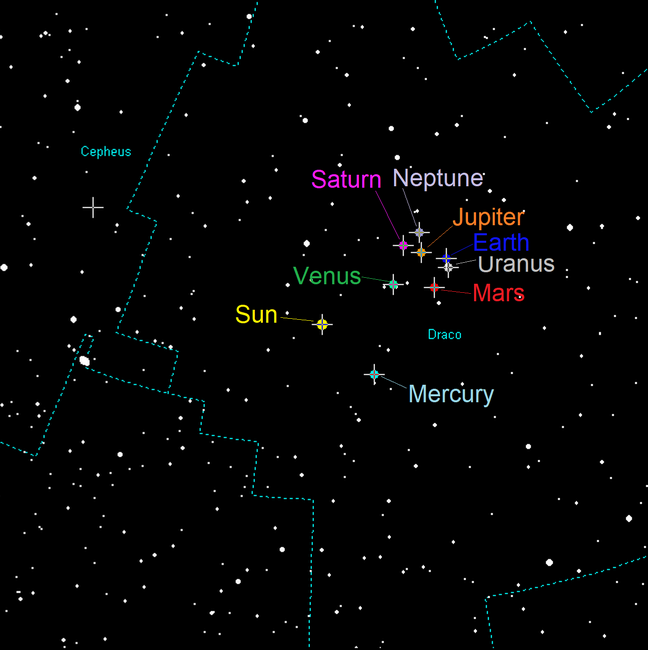
The north orbital poles of the Solar System major planets all lie within Draco. The central yellow dot represents the Sun's rotation axis north pole. Jupiter's north orbital pole is colored orange, Mercury's pale blue, Venus's green, Earth's blue, Mars's red, Saturn's magenta, Uranus's grey, and Neptune's lavender. That of the dwarf planet Pluto is shown as the dotless cross off in Cepheus.

An orbital pole is either point at the ends of the orbital normal, an imaginary line segment that runs through a focus of an orbit (of a revolving body like a planet, moon or satellite) and is perpendicular (or normal) to the orbital plane. Projected onto the celestial sphere, orbital poles are similar in concept to celestial poles, but are based on the body's orbit instead of its equator.

The north orbital pole of a revolving body is defined by the right-hand rule. If the fingers of the right hand are curved along the direction of orbital motion, with the thumb extended and oriented to be parallel to the orbital axis, then the direction the thumb points is defined to be the orbital north.

The poles of Earth's orbit are referred to as the ecliptic poles. For the remaining planets, the orbital pole in ecliptic coordinates is given by the longitude of the ascending node (☊) and inclination (i): ℓ = ☊ − 90° , b = 90° − i . In the following table, the planetary orbit poles are given in both celestial coordinates and the ecliptic coordinates for the Earth.

Object	☊	i	Ecl.Lon.	Ecl.Lat.	RA (α)	Dec (δ)
Mercury	48.331°	7.005°	318.331°	82.995°	18^{h} 43^{m} 57.1^{s}	+61° 26′ 52″
Venus	76.678°	3.395°	346.678°	86.605°	18^{h} 32^{m} 01.8^{s}	+65° 34′ 01″
Earth	140° (Note: When inclination is very near 0, the location of nodes is somewhat uncertain, and is less useful to orient the orbit. Likewise when latitude is very near a pole (±90°), the longitude is less certain or useful.)	0.0001°	50°	89.9999°	18^{h} 00^{m} 00.0^{s}	+66° 33′ 38.84″
Mars	49.562°	1.850°	319.562°	88.150°	18^{h} 13^{m} 29.7^{s}	+65° 19′ 22″
Ceres	80.494°	10.583°	350.494°	79.417°	19^{h} 33^{m} 33.1^{s}	+62° 50′ 57″
Jupiter	100.492°	1.305°	10.492°	88.695°	18^{h} 13^{m} 00.8^{s}	+66° 45′ 53″
Saturn	113.643°	2.485°	23.643°	87.515°	18^{h} 23^{m} 46.8^{s}	+67° 26′ 55″
Uranus	73.989°	0.773°	343.989°	89.227°	18^{h} 07^{m} 24.1^{s}	+66° 20′ 12″
Neptune	131.794°	1.768°	41.794°	88.232°	18^{h} 13^{m} 54.1^{s}	+67° 42′ 08″
Pluto	110.287°	17.151°	20.287°	72.849°	20^{h} 56^{m} 3.7^{s}	+66° 32′ 31″

When an artificial satellite orbits close to another large body, it can only maintain continuous observations in areas near its orbital poles. The continuous viewing zone (CVZ) of the Hubble Space Telescope lies inside roughly 24° of Hubble's orbital poles, which precess around the Earth's axis every 56 days.

== Ecliptic pole ==
The ecliptic is the plane on which Earth orbits the Sun. The ecliptic poles are the two points where the ecliptic axis, the imaginary line perpendicular to the ecliptic, intersects the celestial sphere.

The two ecliptic poles are mapped below.

The north ecliptic pole is in Draco.	The south ecliptic pole is in Dorado.

Due to axial precession, either celestial pole completes a circuit around the nearer ecliptic pole every 25,800 years.

As of 1 January 2000, the positions of the ecliptic poles expressed in equatorial coordinates, as a consequence of Earth's axial tilt, are the following:

- North: right ascension 18^{h} 0^{m} 0.0^{s} (exact), declination +66° 33′ 38.55″
- South: right ascension 6^{h} 0^{m} 0.0^{s} (exact), declination −66° 33′ 38.55″

The north ecliptic pole is located near the Cat's Eye Nebula and the south ecliptic pole is located near the Large Magellanic Cloud.

It is impossible anywhere on Earth for either ecliptic pole to be at the zenith in the night sky. By definition, the ecliptic poles are located 90° from the Sun's position. Therefore, whenever and wherever either ecliptic pole is directly overhead, the Sun must be on the horizon. The ecliptic poles can contact the zenith only within the Arctic and Antarctic circles.

The galactic coordinates of the north ecliptic pole can be calculated as ℓ = 96.38°, b = 29.81° (see celestial coordinate system).

== See also ==
- Celestial pole
- Invariable plane
- Polar alignment
- Pole star
- Poles of astronomical bodies
