= Kilometre =

Unit of length equal to 1,000 metres

kilometre
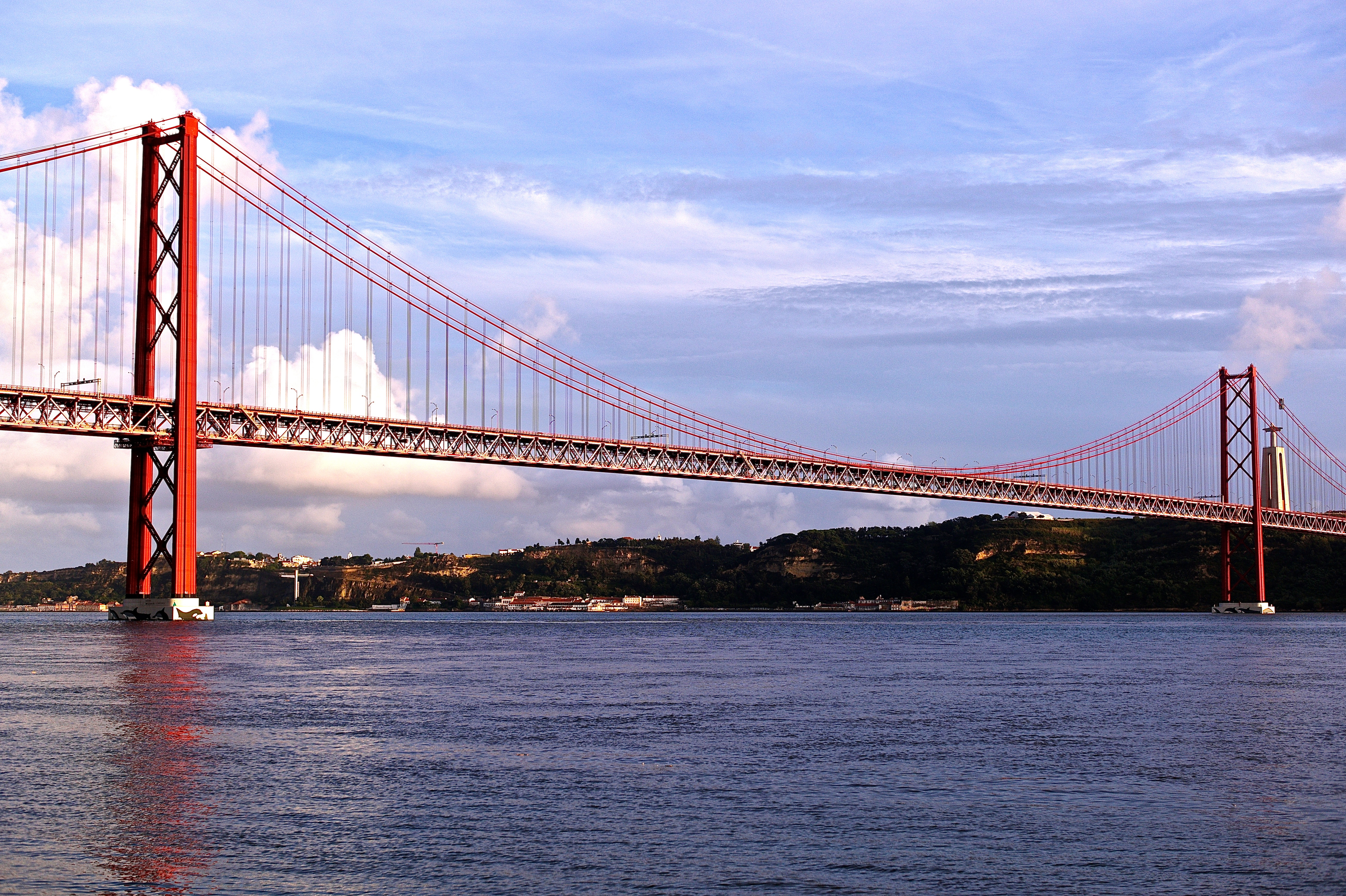
- The main span of the 25 de Abril Bridge in Lisbon, Portugal is 1.013 kilometres (1,013 m).

General information
- Unit system: SI
- Unit of: length
- Symbol: km

Conversions
1 km in ...	... is equal to ...
- SI base units: 1000 m
- imperial/US units: ≈ 0.62137 mi ≈ 1093.6 yd ≈ 3280.8 ft
- nautical units: ≈ 0.53996 nmi

The kilometre (SI symbol: km; /ˈkɪləmiːtər/ or /kɪˈlɒmətər/), spelt kilometer in American English, is a unit of length in the International System of Units (SI), equal to one thousand metres (kilo- being the SI prefix for 1000). It is the preferred measurement unit to express distances between geographical places on land in most of the world; notable exceptions are the United States, the United Kingdom, and Liberia where the statute mile is used.

== Pronunciation ==
There are two common pronunciations for the word.

1. /ˈkɪləmiːtər, -loʊ-/
2. /kɪˈlɒmɪtər/

The first pronunciation follows a pattern in English whereby SI units are pronounced with the stress on the first syllable (as in kilogram, kilojoule and kilohertz) and the pronunciation of the actual base unit does not change irrespective of the prefix (as in centimetre, millimetre, nanometre and so on). It is generally preferred by the British Broadcasting Corporation (BBC), the Canadian Broadcasting Corporation (CBC), and the Australian Broadcasting Corporation (ABC).

Many other users, particularly in countries where SI (the metric system) is not widely used, use the second pronunciation with stress on the second syllable. The second pronunciation follows the stress pattern used for the names of measuring instruments (such as micrometer, barometer, thermometer, tachometer, and speedometer). The contrast is even more obvious in countries that use the American spelling of the word metre. This pronunciation is irregular because it makes the kilometre the only SI unit with the stress on the second syllable.

After Australia introduced the metric system in 1970, the first pronunciation was declared official by the government's Metric Conversion Board. However, the Australian prime minister at the time, Gough Whitlam, insisted that the second pronunciation was the correct one because of the Greek origins of the two parts of the word.

== Equivalence to other units of length ==
1 kilometre	≡	1000	metres
1 kilometre	≈	3281	feet
1 kilometre	≈	1094	yards
1 kilometre	≈	0.621	miles
1 kilometre	≈	0.540	nautical miles
1 kilometre	≈	6.68×10^{−9}	astronomical units (Note: One astronomical unit is defined as exactly 149597870700 m.)
1 kilometre	≈	1.06×10^{−13}	light-years (Note: A light-year is equal to 9.4607304725808×10^{12} km the distance light travels through vacuum in one year (365.25 days).)
1 kilometre	≈	3.24×10^{−14}	parsecs

== History ==
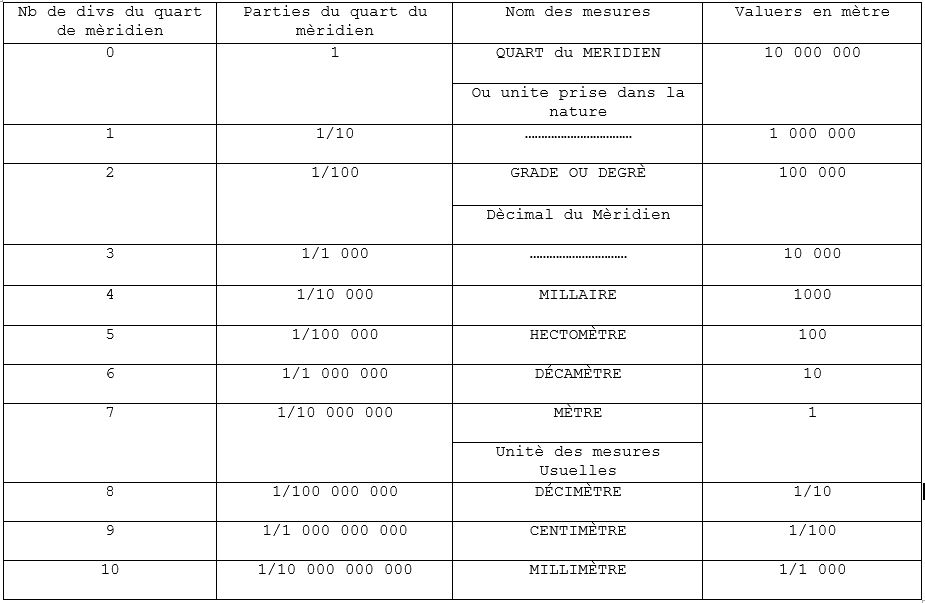
Historical divisions of the meridian in France

By a decree on 8 May 1790, the French National Constituent Assembly ordered the French Academy of Sciences to develop a new measurement system. In August 1793, the French National Convention decreed the metre as the sole length measurement system in the French Republic and it was based on 1/10 millionth of the distance from the orbital poles (either North or South) to the Equator, this being a truly internationally based unit. The first name of the kilometre was "Millaire". Although the metre was formally defined in 1799, the myriametre (10000 metres) was preferred to the "kilometre" for everyday use. The term "myriamètre" appeared a number of times in the text of Develey's book Physique d'Emile: ou, Principes de la science de la nature, (published in 1802), while the term kilometre only appeared in an appendix. French maps published in 1835 had scales showing myriametres and "lieues de Poste" (Postal leagues of about 4288 metres).

The Dutch, on the other hand, adopted the kilometre in 1817 but gave it the local name of the mijl. It was only in 1867 that the term "kilometer" became the only official unit of measure in the Netherlands to represent 1000 metres.

Two German textbooks dated 1842 and 1848 respectively give a snapshot of the use of the kilometre across Europe: the kilometre was in use in the Netherlands and in Italy, and the myriametre was in use in France.

In 1935, the International Committee for Weights and Measures (CIPM) officially abolished the prefix "myria-" and with it the "myriametre", leaving the kilometre as the recognised unit of length for measurements of that magnitude.

The symbol km for the kilometre is in lower case and has been standardised by the BIPM. A slang term for the kilometre in the US, UK, and Canadian militaries is klick.

== See also ==
- Conversion of units, for comparison with other units of length
- Cubic metre
- Distance traveled
- Metric prefix
- Orders of magnitude (length)
- Square kilometre
