= Anti-sidereal time =

Artificial time standard

Anti-sidereal time and extended-sidereal time are artificial time standards used to analyze the daily variation in the number of cosmic rays received on Earth. Anti-sidereal time has about 364.25 days per year, one day less than the number of days in a year of solar time, 365.25. Thus each anti-sidereal day is longer than a solar day (24 hr) by about four minutes or 24 hr 4 min. Extended-sidereal time has about 367.25 days per year, one day more than the number of days in a year of sidereal time, 366.25. Thus each extended-sidereal day is shorter than a sidereal day (23 hr 56 min) by about four minutes or 23 hr 52 min. All years mentioned have the same length.

== Amplitude modulation sidebands ==
Cosmic rays received on Earth exhibit daily variations in amplitude in solar time due to the distribution of cosmic rays in the inner heliosphere and to the Compton-Getting effect caused by Earth's orbital velocity around the Sun. Other daily variations in amplitude in sidereal time are caused by the anisotropy in the direction from which cosmic rays are received relative to the plane of our galaxy, the Milky Way. Both are contaminated by an annual seasonal variation. The daily solar variation is amplitude modulated by the seasonal variation of one cycle/year, producing sidebands on either side of the solar frequency, about 365 cycles/year, of 365−1=364 cycles/year and 365+1=366 cycles/year. Similarly, an annual amplitude modulation of one cycle/year of the sidereal frequency, about 366 cycles/year, produces sidebands of 366−1=365 cycles/year and 366+1=367 cycles/year. The upper sideband of the solar frequency contaminates the amplitude of the sidereal frequency, while the lower sideband of the sidereal frequency contaminates the amplitude of the solar frequency. Because the magnitudes of the two sidebands produced by amplitude modulation of the solar frequency are the same and no known natural phenomenon recurs at 364 cycles/year, the spurious amplitude at the sidereal frequency can be corrected by subtracting any signal present at the anti-sidereal frequency. Similarly, the spurious amplitude in the solar frequency of 365 cycles per year can be corrected by subtracting any signal present at the extended-sidereal frequency of 367 cycles per year.

== See also ==
- Earth's rotation
