= Meridian (astronomy) =

Great semicircle passing through the celestial poles

The meridian on the celestial sphere. An observer's upper meridian, a semicircle contains their zenith and both celestial poles; the observer's local meridian is the semicircle that passes through their zenith and the north and south points of their horizon.

In astronomy, the meridian is the great circle passing through the celestial poles, as well as the zenith and nadir of an observer's location. Consequently, it contains also the north and south points on the horizon, and it is perpendicular to the celestial equator and horizon.

Meridians, celestial and geographical, are determined by the pencil of planes passing through the Earth's rotation axis. For a location not on this axis, there is a unique meridian plane in this axial-pencil through that location. The intersection of this plane with Earth's surface defines two geographical meridians (either one east and one west of the prime meridian, or else the prime meridian itself and its anti-meridian), and the intersection of the plane with the celestial sphere is the celestial meridian for that location and time.

There are several ways to divide the meridian into semicircles. In one approach, the observer's upper meridian extends from a celestial pole and passes through the zenith to contact the opposite pole, while the lower meridian passes through the nadir to contact both poles at the opposite ends. In another approach known as the horizontal coordinate system, the meridian is divided into the local meridian, the semicircle that contains the observer's zenith and the north and south points of their horizon, and the opposite semicircle, which contains the nadir and the north and south points of their horizon.

On any given (sidereal) day/night, a celestial object will appear to drift across, or transit, the observer's upper meridian as Earth rotates, since the meridian is fixed to the local horizon. At culmination, the object contacts the upper meridian and reaches its highest point in the sky. An object's right ascension and the local sidereal time can be used to determine the time of its culmination (see hour angle).

== Etymology ==
The term meridian comes from the Latin meridies, which means both "midday" and "south", as the celestial equator appears to tilt southward from the Northern Hemisphere.

== See also ==
- Meridian (geography)
- Prime meridian (planets)
- Prime vertical, the vertical circle perpendicular to a meridian
- Longitude (planets)
