= Right ascension =

Astronomical equivalent of longitude

Right ascension and declination as seen on the inside of the celestial sphere. The primary direction of the system is the March equinox, the ascending node of the ecliptic (red) on the celestial equator (blue). Right ascension is measured eastward up to 24^{h} along the celestial equator from the primary direction.

In astronomy, right ascension (abbreviated RA; symbol α) is the angular distance of a particular point measured eastward along the celestial equator from the Sun at the March equinox to the (hour circle of the) point in question above the Earth. When paired with declination, these astronomical coordinates specify the location of a point on the celestial sphere in the equatorial coordinate system.

An old term, right ascension (Latin: ascensio recta) refers to the ascension, or the point on the celestial equator that rises with any celestial object as seen from Earth's equator, where the celestial equator intersects the horizon at a right angle. It contrasts with oblique ascension, the point on the celestial equator that rises with any celestial object as seen from a given latitude on Earth, where the celestial equator intersects the horizon at an oblique angle.

== Explanation ==
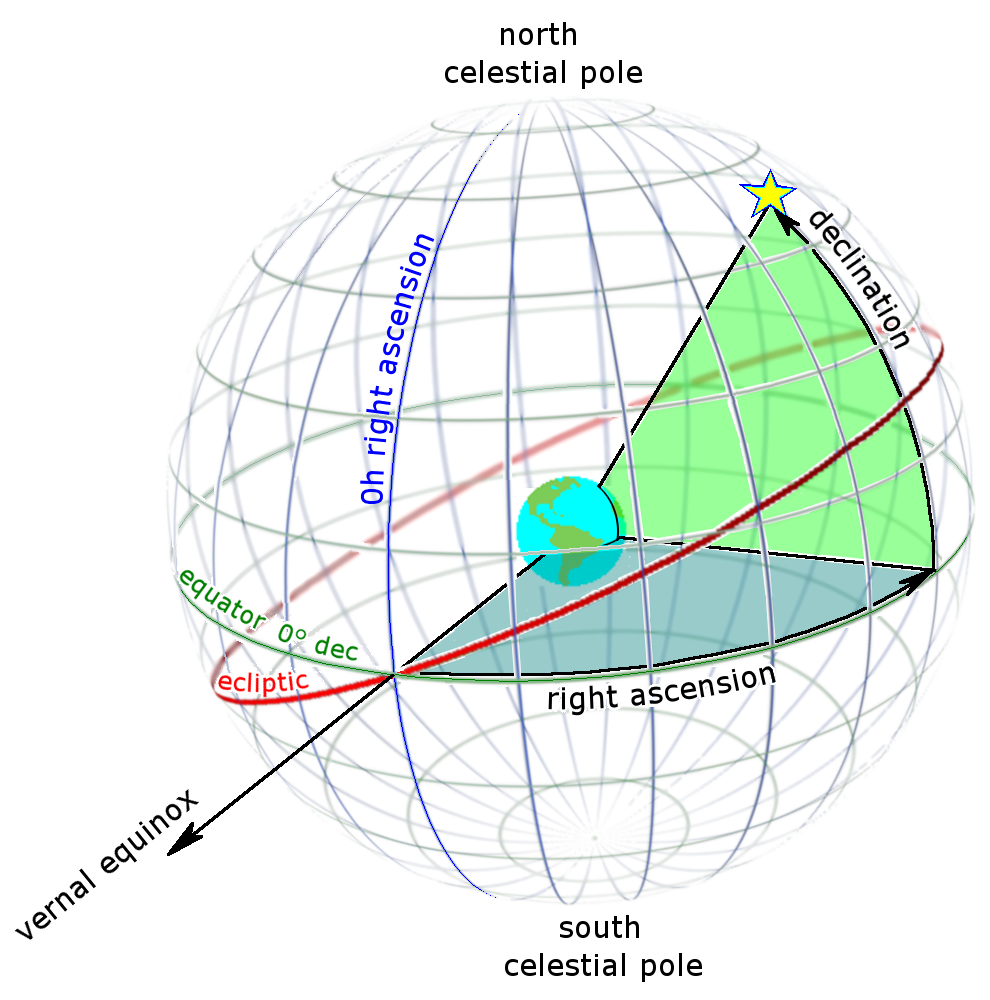
Right ascension (blue) and declination (green) as seen from outside the celestial sphere

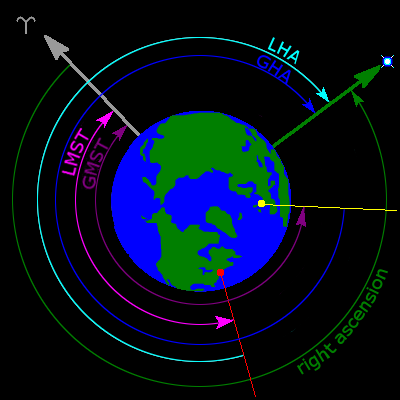
Various hour angles are depicted here. The symbol ♈︎ marks the March equinox direction. Assuming the day of the year is the March equinox: the Sun lies toward the grey arrow, the star marked by a green arrow will appear to rise somewhere in the east about midnight (the Earth drawn from "above" turns anticlockwise). After the observer reaches the green arrow, dawn will over-power (see blue sky Rayleigh scattering) the star's light for about six hours, before it sets on the western horizon. The Right ascension of the star is about 18^{h}. 18^{h} means it is a March early-hours star and in blue sky in the morning. If 12^{h} RA, the star would be a March all-night star as opposite the March equinox. If 6^{h} RA the star would be a March late-hours star, at its high (meridian) at dusk.

Right ascension is the celestial equivalent of terrestrial longitude. Both right ascension and longitude measure an angle from a primary direction (a zero point) on an equator.

In astronomy, the equinox refers to a direction in space that is coincident with the intersection of the celestial equator and the plane of Earth's orbit. To measure right ascension, 0 hours is in the direction of the Sun from Earth at the March equinox. This is currently located in the constellation Pisces. (Though defined according to the position of Earth and Sun at the March equinox, nevertheless the direction 0 hours persists throughout the year. Meanwhile, the right ascension of the Sun advances 6 hours per season, at 0 hours at the March equinox, at 6 hours at the June solstice, etc.) Right ascension is given as a number of hours after the equinox crosses the observer's meridian that the celestial body will cross the observer's meridian.

The Sun crosses the observer's meridian at local noon. At the March equinox, local noon coincides with 0h right ascension. Celestial bodies with right ascensions greater than 6 hours and less than 18 hours will be widely visible, and a star that is crossing the meridian at midnight that same night will have a right ascension of 12 hours.

At the June solstice, the Sun has a right ascension of 6^{h}, and so bodies with right ascensions greater than 12 hours and less than 24 hours will be widely visible. At the September equinox, the sun has a right ascension of 12^{h}, and so on.

For a specific star example, η Psc is at RA = 01^{h} 31^{m} 29.01026^{s}. At the March equinox, this star crosses a meridian on earth approximately 1.5 hours after the sun crosses the same meridian, so observers on Earth will not be seeing it. At the September equinox, the star continues to cross the meridian at approximately 1.5 hours after the equinox, but now the Sun is at 12 hours after the equinox. This means η Psc will now cross the meridian approximately 13.5 hours after local noon (so about 1.5 hours after local midnight) and will be visible.

Any angular unit could have been chosen for right ascension, but it is customarily measured in hours (^{h}), minutes (^{m}), and seconds (^{s}), with 24^{h} being equivalent to a full circle. Astronomers have chosen this unit to measure right ascension because they measure a star's location by timing its passage through the highest point in the sky as the Earth rotates. The line which passes through the highest point in the sky, called the meridian, is the projection of a longitude line onto the celestial sphere. Since a complete circle contains 24^{h} of right ascension or 360° (degrees of arc), 1/24 of a circle is measured as 1^{h} of right ascension, or 15°; 1/1440 of a circle is measured as 1^{m} of right ascension, or 15 minutes of arc (also written as 15′); and 1/86400 of a circle contains 1^{s} of right ascension, or 15 seconds of arc (also written as 15″). A full circle, measured in right-ascension units, contains 24 × 60 × 60 = 86400^{s}, or 24 × 60 = 1440^{m}, or 24^{h}.

Because right ascensions are measured in hours (of rotation of the Earth), they can be used to time the positions of objects in the sky. For example, if a star with RA = 1^{h} 30^{m} 00^{s} is at its meridian, then a star with RA = 20^{h} 00^{m} 00^{s} will be on the/at its meridian (at its apparent highest point) 18.5 sidereal hours later.

Sidereal hour angle, used in celestial navigation, is similar to right ascension but increases westward rather than eastward. Usually measured in degrees (°), it is the complement of right ascension with respect to 24^{h}. It is important not to confuse sidereal hour angle with the astronomical concept of hour angle, which measures the angular distance of an object westward from the local meridian.

== Symbols and abbreviations ==
Unit	Value	Symbol	Sexagesimal system	In radians
Hour	1/24 circle	^{h}	15°	π/12 rad
Minute	1/60 hour, 1/1440 circle	^{m}	1/4°, 15′	π/720 rad
Second	1/60 minute, 1/3600 hour, 1/86400 circle	^{s}	1/240°, 1/4′, 15″	π/43200 rad

== Effects of precession ==
The Earth's axis traces a small circle (relative to its celestial equator) slowly westward about the celestial poles, completing one cycle in about 26,000 years. This movement, known as precession, causes the coordinates of stationary celestial objects to change continuously, if rather slowly. Therefore, equatorial coordinates (including right ascension) are inherently relative to the year of their observation, and astronomers specify them with reference to a particular year, known as an epoch. Coordinates from different epochs must be mathematically rotated to match each other, or to match a standard epoch. Right ascension for "fixed stars" on the equator increases by about 3.1 seconds per year or 5.1 minutes per century, but for fixed stars away from the equator the rate of change can be anything from negative infinity to positive infinity. (To this must be added the proper motion of a star.) Over a precession cycle of 26,000 years, "fixed stars" that are far from the ecliptic poles increase in right ascension by 24h, or about 5.6' per century, whereas stars within 23.5° of an ecliptic pole undergo a net change of 0h. The right ascension of Polaris is increasing quickly—in AD 2000 it was 2.5h, but when it gets closest to the north celestial pole in 2100 its right ascension will be 6h. The North Ecliptic Pole in Draco and the South Ecliptic Pole in Dorado are always at right ascension 18^{h} and 6^{h} respectively.

The currently used standard epoch is J2000.0, which is January 1, 2000 at 12:00 TT. The prefix "J" indicates that it is a Julian epoch. Prior to J2000.0, astronomers used the successive Besselian epochs B1875.0, B1900.0, and B1950.0.

== History ==
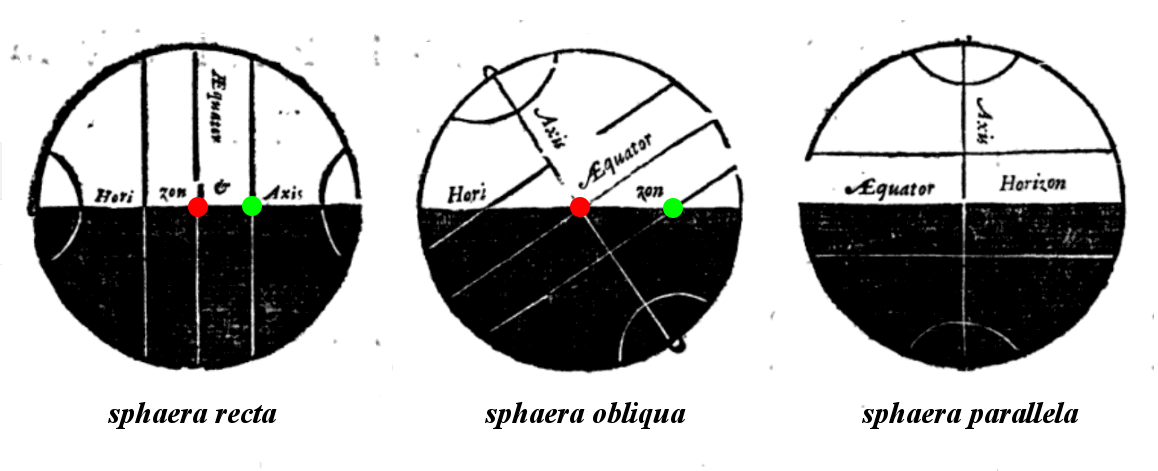
How right ascension got its name. Ancient astronomy was very concerned with the rise and set of celestial objects. The ascension was the point on the celestial equator (red) which rose or set at the same time as an object (green) on the celestial sphere. As seen from the equator, both were on a great circle from pole to pole (left, sphaera recta or right sphere). From almost anywhere else, they were not (center, sphaera obliqua or oblique sphere). At the poles, objects did not rise or set (right, sphaera parallela or parallel sphere). An object's right ascension was its ascension on a right sphere.

The concept of right ascension has been known at least as far back as Hipparchus who measured stars in equatorial coordinates in the 2nd century BC. But Hipparchus and his successors made their star catalogs in ecliptic coordinates, and the use of RA was limited to special cases.

With the invention of the telescope, it became possible for astronomers to observe celestial objects in greater detail, provided that the telescope could be kept pointed at the object for a period of time. The easiest way to do that is to use an equatorial mount, which allows the telescope to be aligned with one of its two pivots parallel to the Earth's axis. A motorized clock drive often is used with an equatorial mount to cancel out the Earth's rotation. As the equatorial mount became widely adopted for observation, the equatorial coordinate system, which includes right ascension, was adopted at the same time for simplicity. Equatorial mounts could then be accurately pointed at objects with known right ascension and declination by the use of setting circles. The first star catalog to use right ascension and declination was John Flamsteed's Historia Coelestis Britannica (1712, 1725).

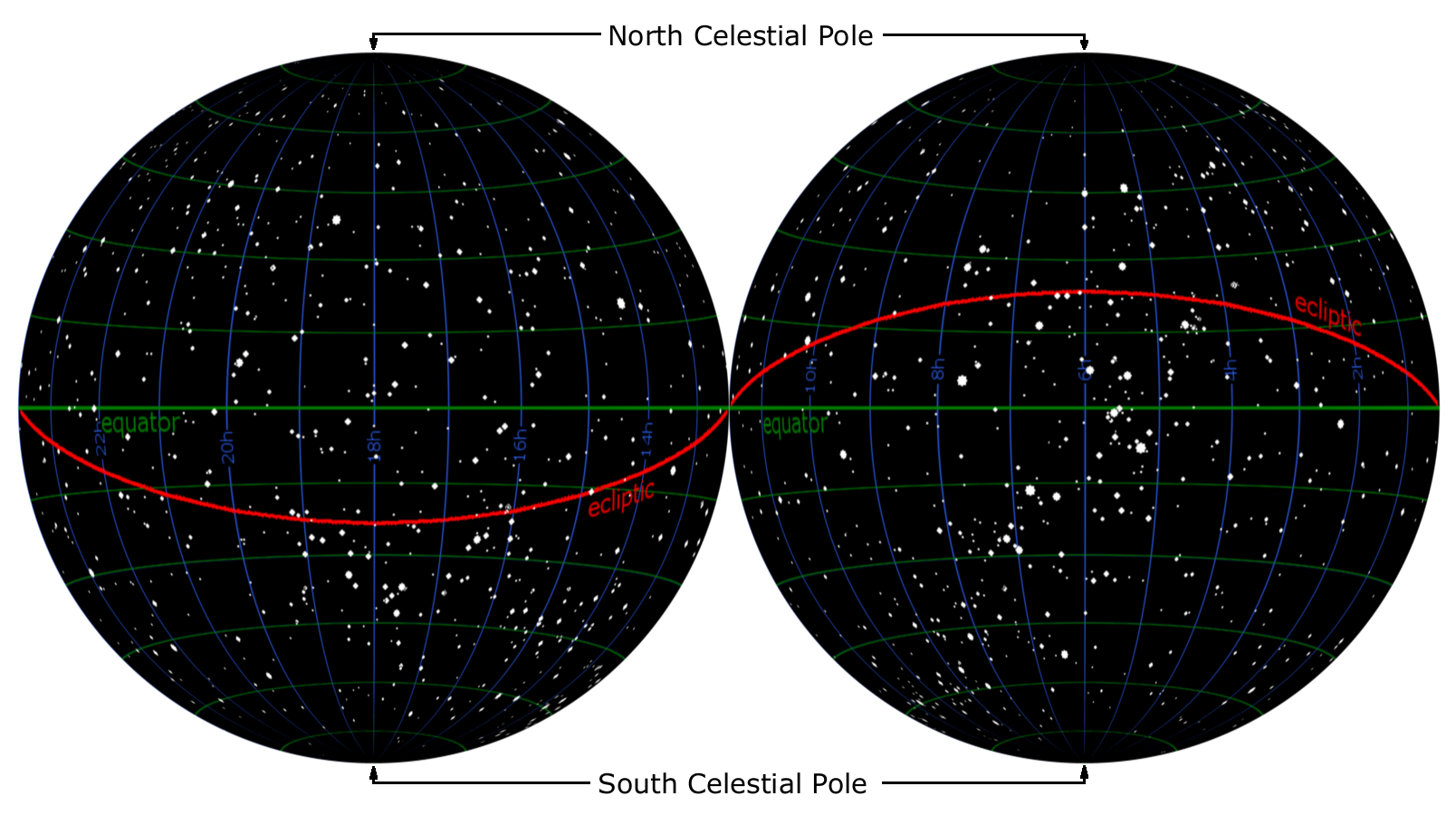
The entire sky, divided into two halves. Right ascension (blue) begins at the March equinox (at right, at the intersection of the ecliptic (red) and the equator (green)) and increases eastward (towards the left). The lines of right ascension (blue) from pole to pole divide the sky into 24 hours, each equivalent to 15°.

== See also ==
- Celestial coordinate system
- Celestial pole
- Declination
- Ecliptic
- Equatorial coordinate system
- Equinoctial colure
- Geographic coordinate system
- Hour angle
- Right ascension of the ascending node (RAAN)
- Setting circles
- Sidereal time
