= Sidereal time =

Timekeeping system on Earth relative to the celestial sphere

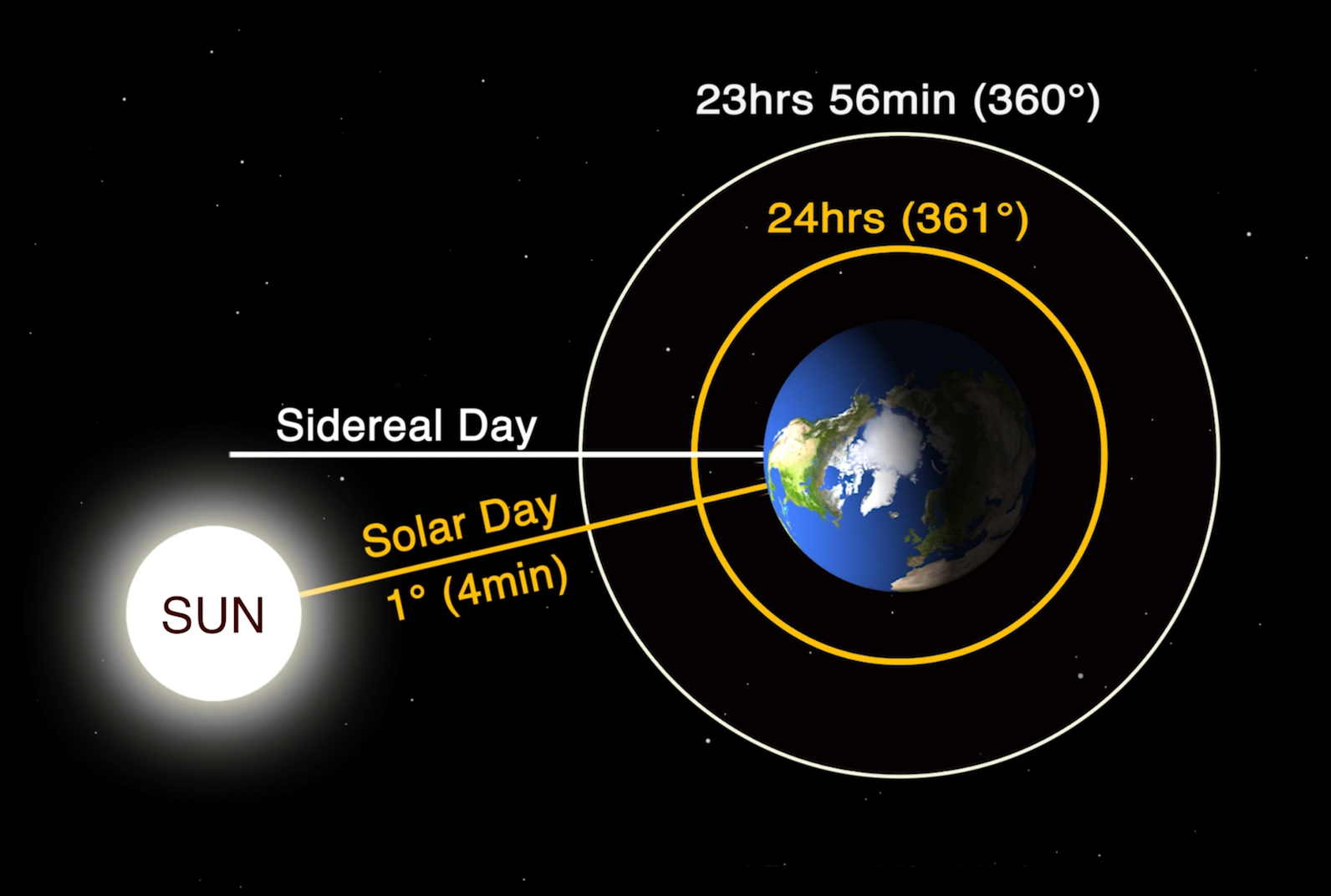
A sidereal day is one Earth rotation relative to the stars; a solar day is one Earth rotation relative to the Sun. The Earth rotates about 366 times per 'normal' 365-day year relative to the stars, so Earth's sidereal day is about four minutes shorter than Earth's solar day. (Angle exaggerated for visibility.)

Animation comparing a sidereal day to a solar day

Sidereal time ("sidereal" pronounced /saɪˈdɪəriəl, sə-/ sy-DEER-ee-əl, sə-) is a system of timekeeping used especially by astronomers. Using sidereal time and the celestial coordinate system, it is easy to locate the positions of celestial objects in the night sky. Sidereal time is a "time scale that is based on Earth's rate of rotation measured relative to the fixed stars". A sidereal day (also known as the sidereal rotation period) represents the time for one rotation about the planet axis relative to the stars.

Viewed from the same location, a star seen at one position in the sky will be seen at the same position on another night at the same time of day (or night), if the day is defined as a sidereal day. This is similar to how the time kept by a sundial (Solar time) can be used to find the location of the Sun. Just as the Sun and Moon appear to rise in the east and set in the west due to the rotation of Earth, so do the stars. Both solar time and sidereal time make use of the regularity of Earth's rotation about its polar axis: solar time is reckoned according to the position of the Sun in the sky while sidereal time is based approximately on the position of the fixed stars on the theoretical celestial sphere.

More exactly, sidereal time is the angle, measured along the celestial equator, from the observer's meridian to the great circle that passes through the March equinox (the northern hemisphere's vernal equinox) and both celestial poles, and is usually expressed in hours, minutes, and seconds. In the context of sidereal time, "March equinox" or "equinox" or "first point of Aries" is currently the direction from the center of the Earth along the line formed by the intersection of the Earth's equator and the ecliptic, toward the constellation Pisces; during ancient times it was toward the constellation Aries. Common time on a typical clock (using mean Solar time) measures a slightly longer cycle, affected not only by Earth's axial rotation but also by Earth's orbit around the Sun.

The March equinox itself precesses slowly westward relative to the fixed stars, completing one revolution in about 25,800 years, so the misnamed "sidereal" day ("sidereal" is derived from the Latin sidus meaning "star") is 0.0084 seconds shorter than the stellar day, Earth's actual period of rotation relative to the fixed stars. The slightly longer stellar period is measured as the Earth rotation angle (ERA), formerly the stellar angle. An increase of 360° in the ERA is a full rotation of the Earth.

A sidereal day on Earth is approximately 86164.0905 seconds (23 h 56 min 4.0905 s or 23.9344696 h). (Seconds are defined as per International System of Units and are not to be confused with ephemeris seconds.) Each day, the sidereal time at any given place and time will be about four minutes shorter than local civil time (which is based on solar time), so that for a complete year the number of sidereal "days" is one more than the number of solar days.

== Comparison to solar time ==
Sidereal time vs solar time. Above left: a distant star (the small orange star) and the Sun are at culmination, on the local meridian m. Centre: only the distant star is at culmination (a mean sidereal day). Right: a few minutes later the Sun is on the local meridian again. A solar day is complete.

Solar time is measured by the apparent diurnal motion of the Sun. Local noon in apparent solar time is the moment when the Sun is exactly due south or north (depending on the observer's latitude and the season). A mean solar day (what we normally measure as a "day") is the average time between local solar noons ("average" since this varies slightly over a year).

Earth makes one rotation around its axis each sidereal day; during that time it moves a short distance (about 1°) along its orbit around the Sun. So after a sidereal day has passed, Earth still needs to rotate slightly more before the Sun reaches local noon according to solar time. A mean solar day is, therefore, nearly 4 minutes longer than a sidereal day.

The stars are so far away that Earth's movement along its orbit makes nearly no difference to their apparent direction (except for the nearest stars if measured with extreme accuracy; see parallax), and so they return to their highest point at the same time each sidereal day.

Another way to understand this difference is to notice that, relative to the stars, as viewed from Earth, the position of the Sun at the same time each day appears to move around Earth once per year. A year has about 365.24 solar days but 366.24 sidereal days. Therefore, there is one fewer solar day per year than there are sidereal days, similar to an observation of the coin rotation paradox.

== Effects of precession ==
Earth's rotation is not a simple rotation around an axis that remains always parallel to itself. Earth's rotational axis itself rotates about a second axis, orthogonal to the plane of Earth's orbit, taking about 25,800 years to perform a complete rotation. This phenomenon is termed the precession of the equinoxes. Because of this precession, the stars appear to move around Earth in a manner more complicated than a simple constant rotation.

For this reason, to simplify the description of Earth's orientation in astronomy and geodesy, it was conventional to chart the positions of the stars in the sky according to right ascension and declination, which are based on a frame of reference that follows Earth's precession, and to keep track of Earth's rotation, through sidereal time, relative to this frame as well. (The conventional reference frame, for purposes of star catalogues, was replaced in 1998 with the International Celestial Reference Frame, which is fixed with respect to extra-galactic radio sources. Because of the great distances, these sources have no appreciable proper motion.) In this frame of reference, Earth's rotation is close to constant, but the stars appear to rotate slowly with a period of about 25,800 years. It is also in this frame of reference that the tropical year (or solar year), the year related to Earth's seasons, represents one orbit of Earth around the Sun. The precise definition of a sidereal day is the time taken for one rotation of Earth in this precessing frame of reference.

== Modern definitions ==
During the past, time was measured by observing stars with instruments such as photographic zenith tubes and Danjon astrolabes, and the passage of stars across defined lines would be timed with the observatory clock. Then, using the right ascension of the stars from a star catalog, the time when the star should have passed through the meridian of the observatory was computed, and a correction to the time kept by the observatory clock was computed. Sidereal time was defined such that the March equinox would transit the meridian of the observatory at 0 hours local sidereal time.

Beginning during the 1970s, the radio astronomy methods very-long-baseline interferometry (VLBI) and pulsar timing overtook optical instruments for the most precise astrometry. This resulted in the determination of UT1 (mean solar time at 0° longitude) using VLBI, a new measure of the Earth Rotation Angle, and new definitions of sidereal time. These changes became effective 1 January 2003.

=== Earth rotation angle ===
The Earth rotation angle (ERA) measures the rotation of the Earth from an origin on the celestial equator, the Celestial Intermediate Origin, also termed the Celestial Ephemeris Origin, that has no instantaneous motion along the equator; it was originally referred to as the non-rotating origin. This point is very close to the equinox of J2000.

ERA, measured in radians, is related to UT1 by a simple linear relation:
$$\theta(t_U)=2\pi(0.779\,057\,273\,2640+1.002\,737\,811\,911\,354\,48\cdot t_U)$$
where t_{U} is the Julian UT1 date (JD) minus 2451545.0. The linear coefficient represents the Earth's rotation speed around its own axis.

ERA replaces Greenwich Apparent Sidereal Time (GAST). The origin on the celestial equator for GAST, termed the true equinox, does move, due to the movement of the equator and the ecliptic. The lack of motion of the origin of ERA is considered a significant advantage.

The ERA may be converted to other units; for example, the Astronomical Almanac for the Year 2017 tabulated it in degrees, minutes, and seconds.

As an example, the Astronomical Almanac for the Year 2017 gave the ERA at 0 h 1 January 2017 UT1 as 100° 37′ 12.4365″. Since Coordinated Universal Time (UTC) is within a second or two of UT1, this can be used as an anchor to give the ERA approximately for a given civil time and date.

=== Mean and apparent varieties ===
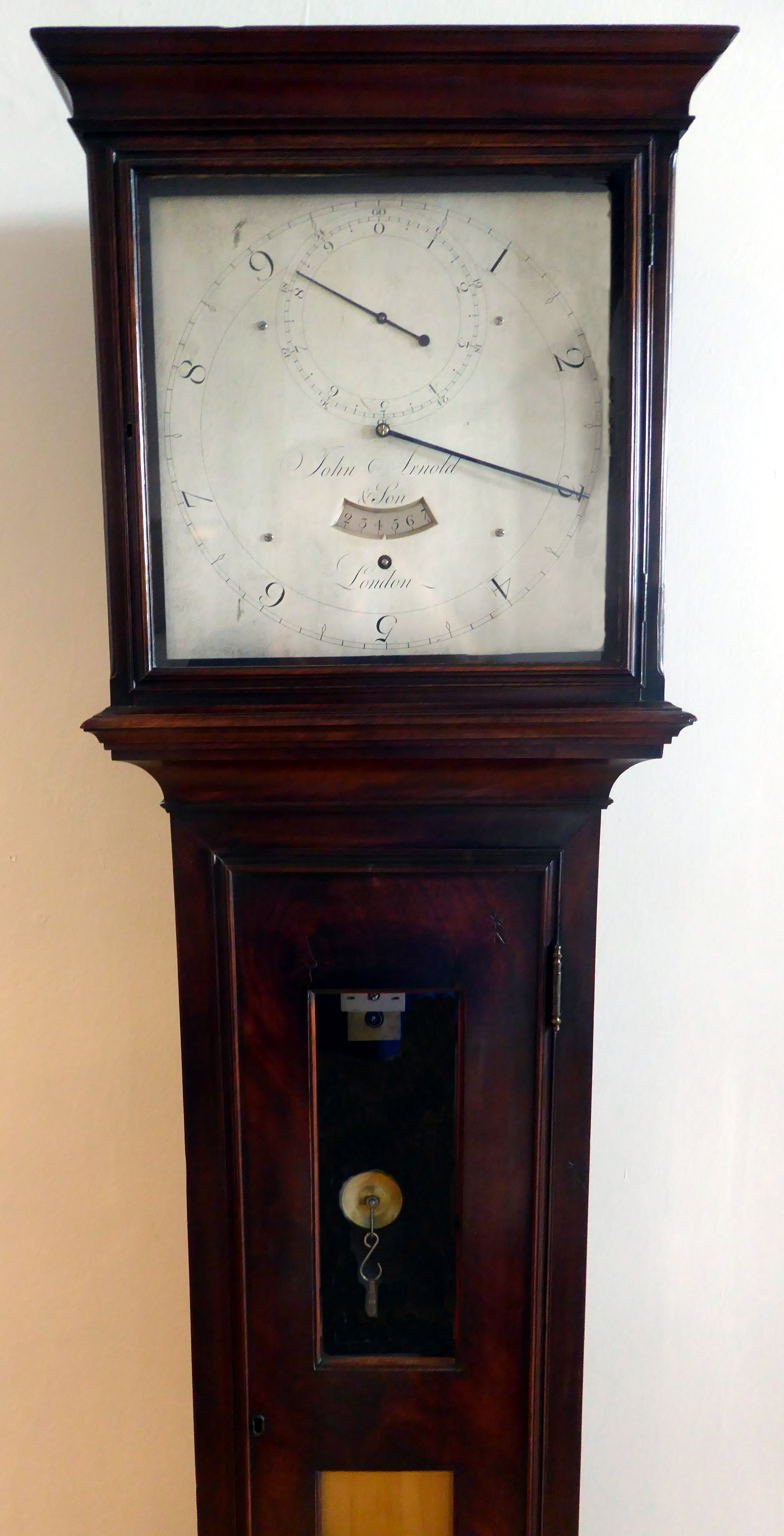
One of the two known surviving sidereal angle clocks in the world, made by John Arnold & Son. It was previously owned by Sir George Shuckburgh-Evelyn. It is on display in the Royal Observatory, Greenwich, London.

Although ERA is intended to replace sidereal time, there is a need to maintain definitions for sidereal time during the transition, and when working with older data and documents.

Similarly to mean solar time, every location on Earth has its own local sidereal time (LST), depending on the longitude of the point. Since it is not feasible to publish tables for every longitude, astronomical tables use Greenwich sidereal time (GST), which is sidereal time on the IERS Reference Meridian, less precisely termed the Greenwich, or Prime meridian. There are two varieties, mean sidereal time if the mean equator and equinox of date are used, and apparent sidereal time if the apparent equator and equinox of date are used. The former ignores the effect of astronomical nutation while the latter includes it. When the choice of location is combined with the choice of including astronomical nutation or not, the acronyms GMST, LMST, GAST, and LAST result.

The following relationships are true:

local mean sidereal time = GMST + east longitude
local apparent sidereal time = GAST + east longitude

The new definitions of Greenwich mean and apparent sidereal time (since 2003, see above) are:
$$\mathrm{GMST}(t_U,t)=\theta(t_U)-E_\mathrm{PREC}(t)$$
$$\mathrm{GAST}(t_U,t)=\theta(t_U)-E_0(t)$$
such that θ is the Earth Rotation Angle, E_{PREC} is the accumulated precession, and E_{0} is equation of the origins, which represents accumulated precession and nutation. The calculation of precession and nutation was described in Chapter 6 of Urban & Seidelmann.

As an example, the Astronomical Almanac for the Year 2017 gave the ERA at 0 h 1 January 2017 UT1 as 100° 37′ 12.4365″ (6 h 42 m 28.8291 s). The GAST was 6 h 43 m 20.7109 s. For GMST the hour and minute were the same but the second was 21.1060.

=== Relationship between solar time and sidereal time intervals ===
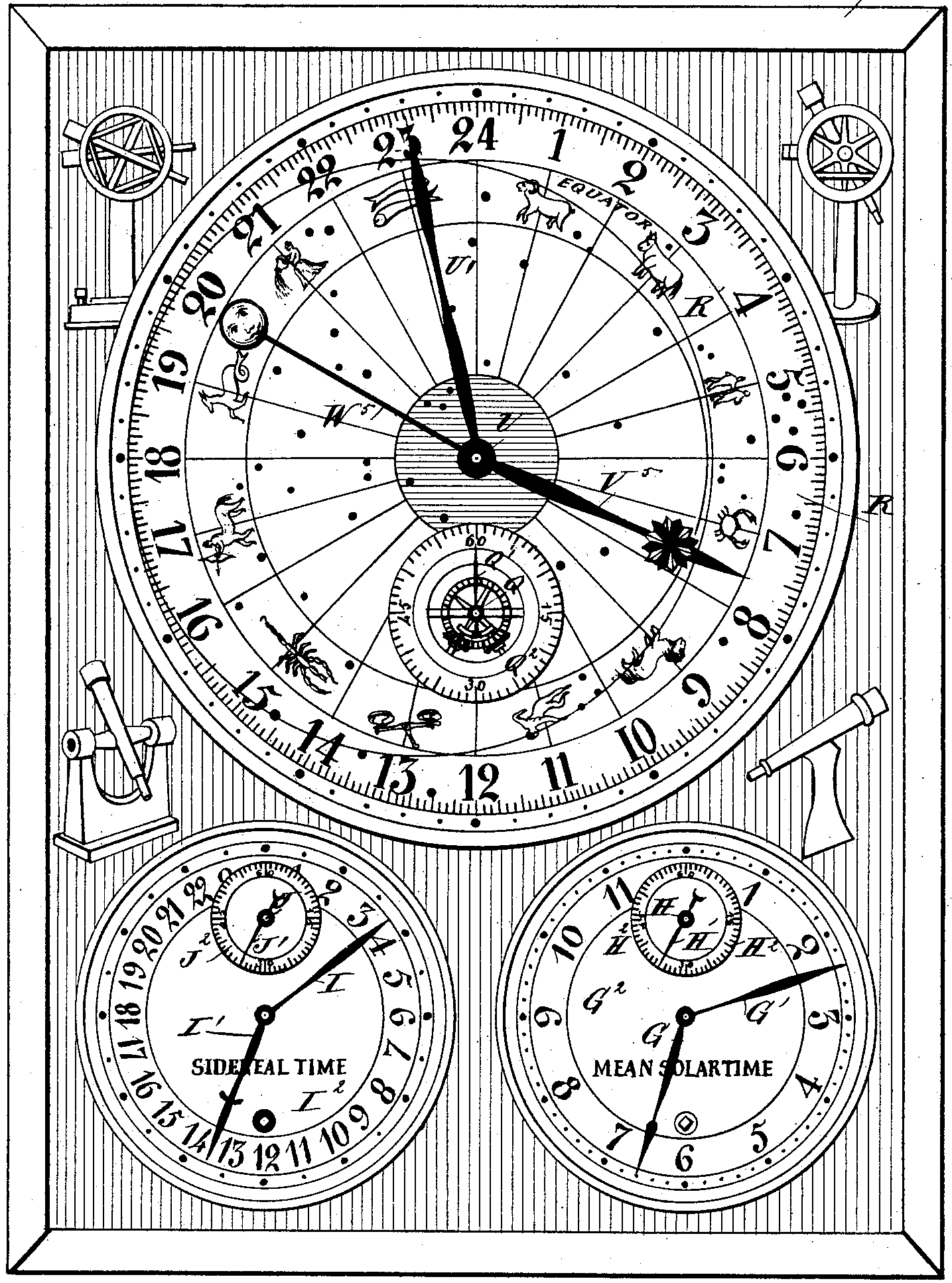
This astronomical clock has dials showing both sidereal time and mean solar time.

If a certain interval I is measured in both mean solar time (UT1) and sidereal time, the numerical value will be greater in sidereal time than in UT1, because sidereal days are shorter than UT1 days. The ratio is:
$$\frac{I_\mathrm{mean\,sidereal}}{I_\mathrm{UT1}}=r'=1.002\,737\,379\,093\,507\,95 + 5.9006\times10^{-11}t - 5.9\times10^{-15}t^2$$
such that t represents the number of Julian centuries elapsed since noon 1 January 2000 Terrestrial Time.

== Sidereal days compared to solar days on other planets ==
Six of the eight solar planets have prograde rotation—that is, they rotate more than once per year in the same direction as they orbit the Sun, so the Sun rises in the east. Venus and Uranus, however, have retrograde rotation. For prograde rotation, the formula relating the lengths of the sidereal and solar days is:

number of sidereal days per orbital period = 1 + number of solar days per orbital period

or, equivalently:

length of solar day = (length of sidereal day)/(1 − (length of sidereal day)/(orbital period)).

When calculating the formula for a retrograde rotation, the operator of the denominator will be a plus sign (put another way, in the original formula the length of the sidereal day must be treated as negative). This is due to the solar day being shorter than the sidereal day for retrograde rotation, as the rotation of the planet would be against the direction of orbital motion.

If a planet rotates prograde, and the sidereal day exactly equals the orbital period, then the formula above gives an infinitely long solar day (division by zero). This is the case for a planet in synchronous rotation; in the case of zero eccentricity, one hemisphere experiences eternal day, the other eternal night, with a "twilight belt" separating them.

All the solar planets more distant from the Sun than Earth are similar to Earth in that, since they experience many rotations per revolution around the Sun, there is only a small difference between the length of the sidereal day and that of the solar day – the ratio of the former to the latter never being less than Earth's ratio of 0.997. But the situation is quite different for Mercury and Venus. Mercury's sidereal day is about two-thirds of its orbital period, so by the prograde formula its solar day lasts for two revolutions around the Sun – three times as long as its sidereal day. Venus rotates retrograde with a sidereal day lasting about 243.0 Earth days, or about 1.08 times its orbital period of 224.7 Earth days; hence by the retrograde formula its solar day is about 116.75 Earth days, and it has about 1.9 solar days per orbital period.

By convention, rotation periods of planets are given in sidereal terms unless otherwise specified.

== See also ==
- Anti-sidereal time
- Earth's rotation
- International Celestial Reference Frame
- Nocturnal (instrument)
- Sidereal month
- Sidereal year
- Synodic day
- Transit instrument
