= Celestial pole =

Imaginary sky rotation points

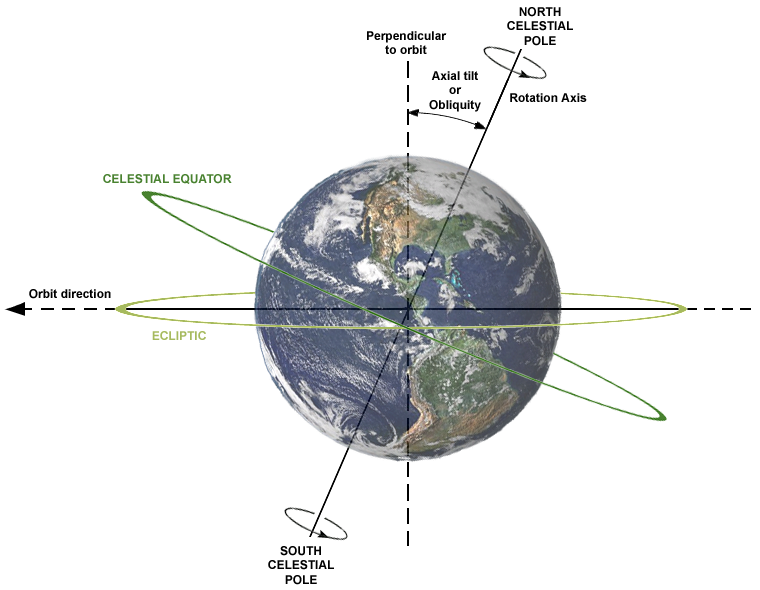
The north and south celestial poles and their relation to axis of rotation, plane of orbit and axial tilt.

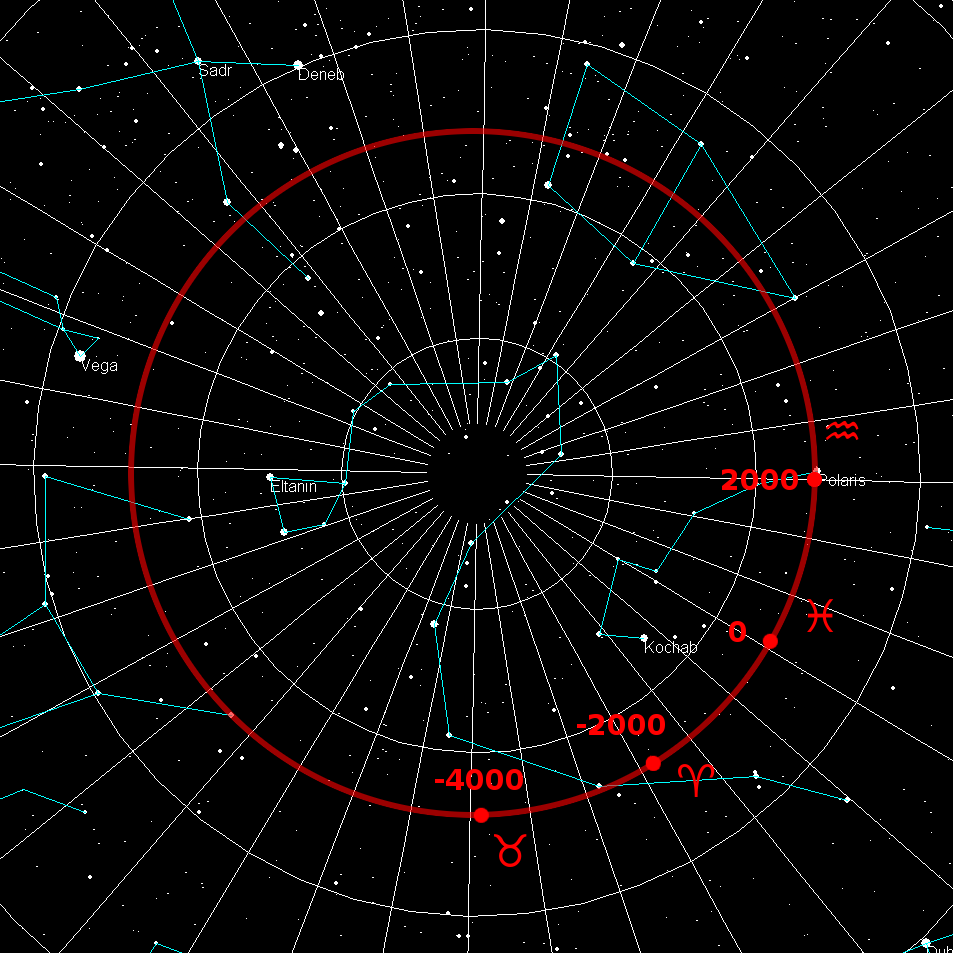
Diagram of the path of the celestial north pole around the ecliptic north pole. The beginning of the four "astrological ages" of the historical period are marked with their zodiac symbols: the Age of Taurus from the Chalcolithic to the Early Bronze Age, the Age of Aries from the Middle Bronze Age to Classical Antiquity, the Age of Pisces from Late Antiquity to the present, and the Age of Aquarius beginning in the mid-3rd millennium.

The north and south celestial poles are the two points in the sky where Earth's axis of rotation, indefinitely extended, intersects the celestial sphere. The north and south celestial poles appear permanently directly overhead to observers at Earth's North Pole and South Pole, respectively. As Earth spins on its axis, the two celestial poles remain fixed in the sky, and all other celestial points appear to rotate around them, completing one circuit per day (strictly, per sidereal day).

The celestial poles are also the poles of the celestial equatorial coordinate system, meaning they have declinations of +90 degrees and −90 degrees (for the north and south celestial poles, respectively). Despite their apparently fixed positions, the celestial poles in the long term do not actually remain permanently fixed against the background of the stars. Because of a phenomenon known as the precession of the equinoxes, the poles trace out circles on the celestial sphere, with a period of about 25,700 years. The Earth's axis is also subject to other complex motions which cause the celestial poles to shift slightly over cycles of varying lengths (see nutation, polar motion and axial tilt). Finally, over very long periods the positions of the stars themselves change, because of the stars' proper motions. To take into account such movement, celestial pole definitions come with an epoch to specify the date of the rotation axis; J2000.0 is the current standard.

An analogous concept applies to other planets: a planet's celestial poles are the points in the sky where the projection of the planet's axis of rotation intersects the celestial sphere. These points vary because different planets' axes are oriented differently (the apparent positions of the stars also change slightly because of parallax effects).

== Finding the north celestial pole ==
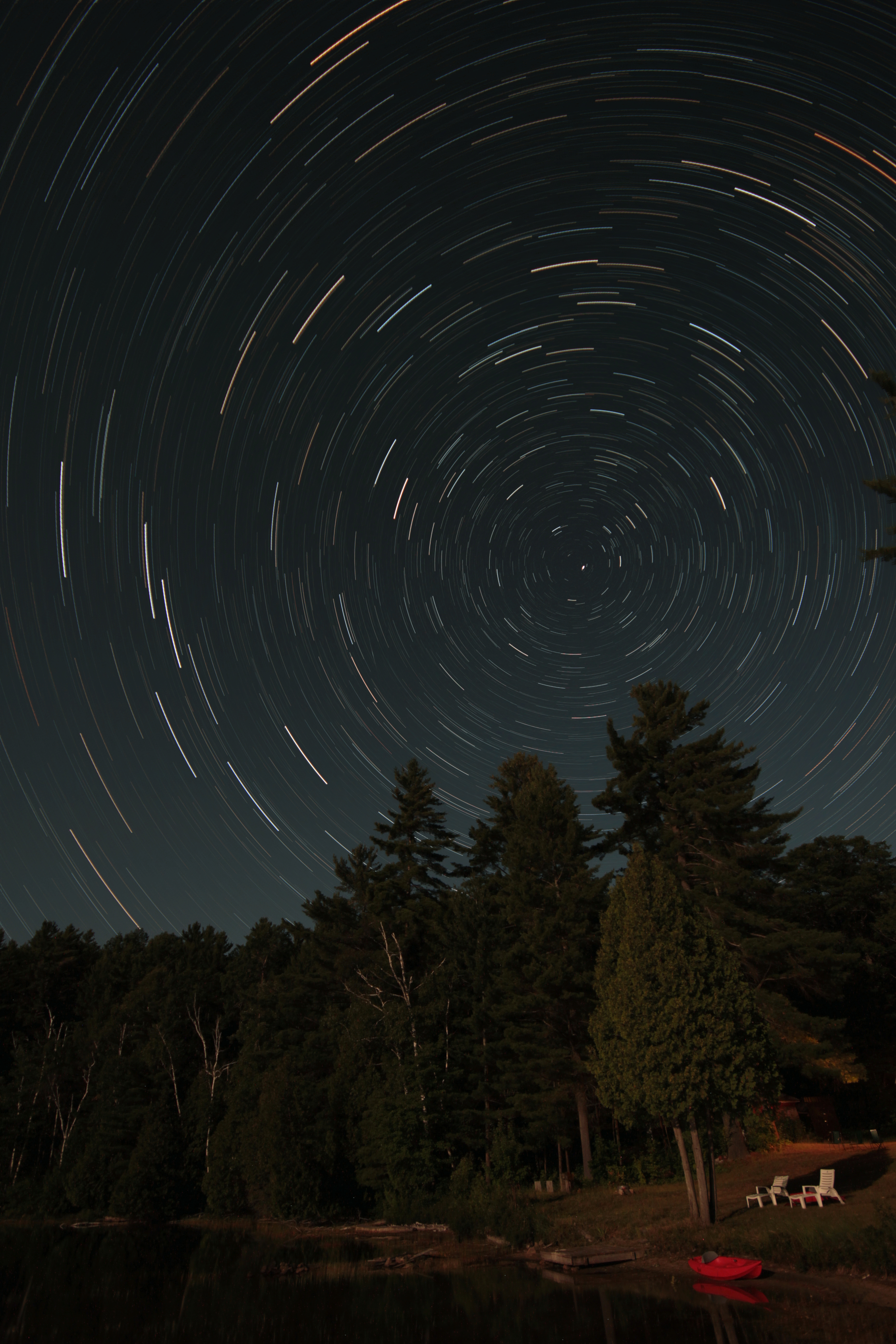
Over the course of an evening in the Northern Hemisphere, circumpolar stars appear to circle around the north celestial pole. Polaris (within 1° of the pole) is the nearly stationary bright star just to the right of center in this star trail photo.

The north celestial pole currently is within one degree of the bright star Polaris (named from the Latin stella polaris, meaning "pole star"). This makes Polaris, colloquially known as the "North Star", useful for navigation in the Northern Hemisphere: not only is it always above the north point of the horizon, but its altitude angle is always (nearly) equal to the observer's geographic latitude (though it can, of course, only be seen from locations in the Northern Hemisphere).

Polaris is near the north celestial pole for only a small fraction of the 25,700-year precession cycle. It will remain a good approximation for about 1,000 years, by which time the pole will have moved closer to Alrai (Gamma Cephei). In about 5,500 years, the pole will have moved near the position of the star Alderamin (Alpha Cephei), and in 12,000 years, Vega (Alpha Lyrae) will become the "North Star", though it will be about six degrees from the true north celestial pole.

To find Polaris, from a point in the Northern Hemisphere, face north and locate the Big Dipper (Plough) and Little Dipper asterisms. Looking at the "cup" part of the Big Dipper, imagine that the two stars at the outside edge of the cup form a line pointing upward out of the cup. This line points directly at the star at the tip of the Little Dipper's handle. That star is Polaris, the North Star.

== Finding the south celestial pole ==
A series of shots show the rotation of Earth's axis relative to the south celestial pole. The Magellanic Clouds and the Southern Cross are clearly visible. Near the end of the video, the Moon rises and illuminates the scene.

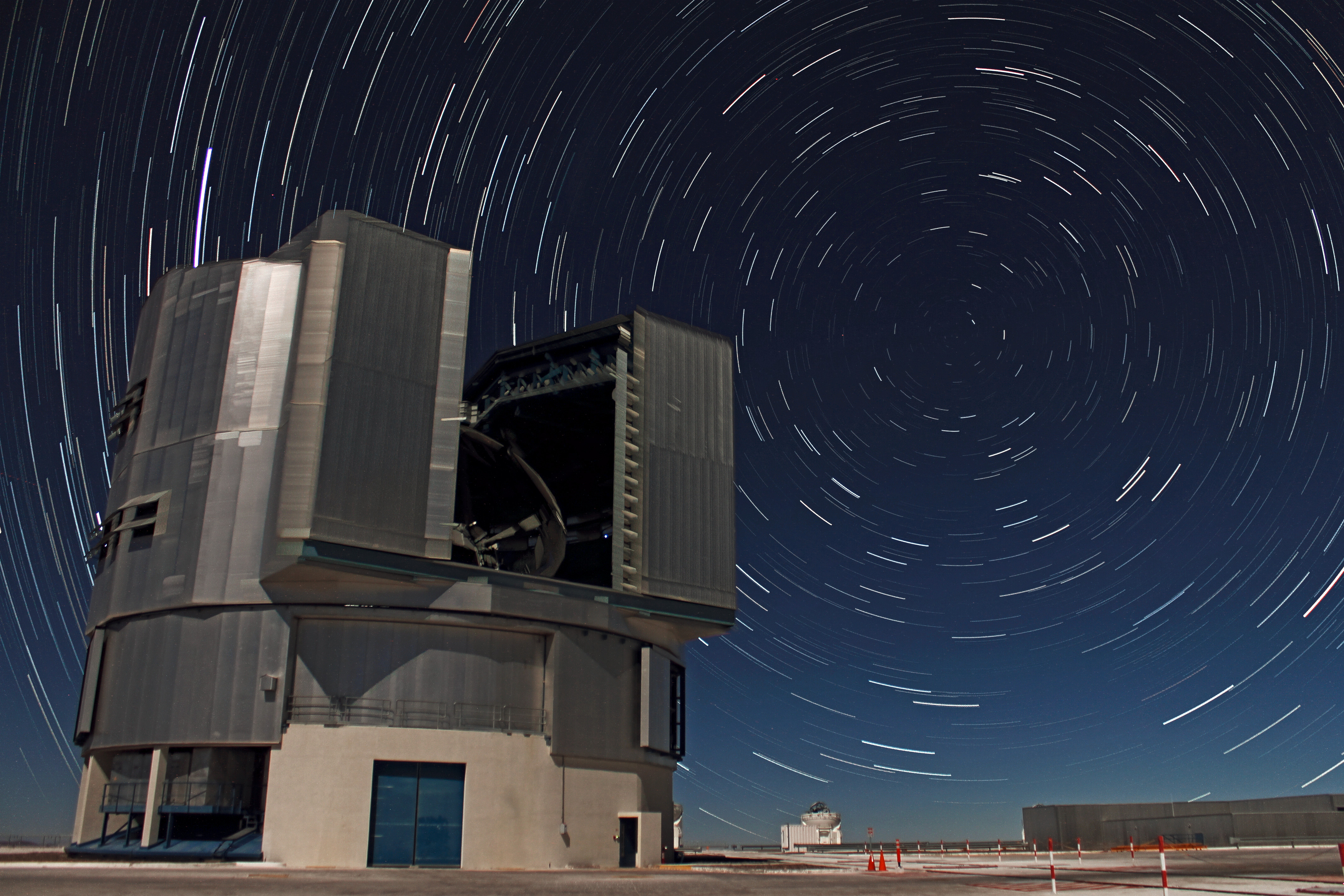
The south celestial pole over the Very Large Telescope

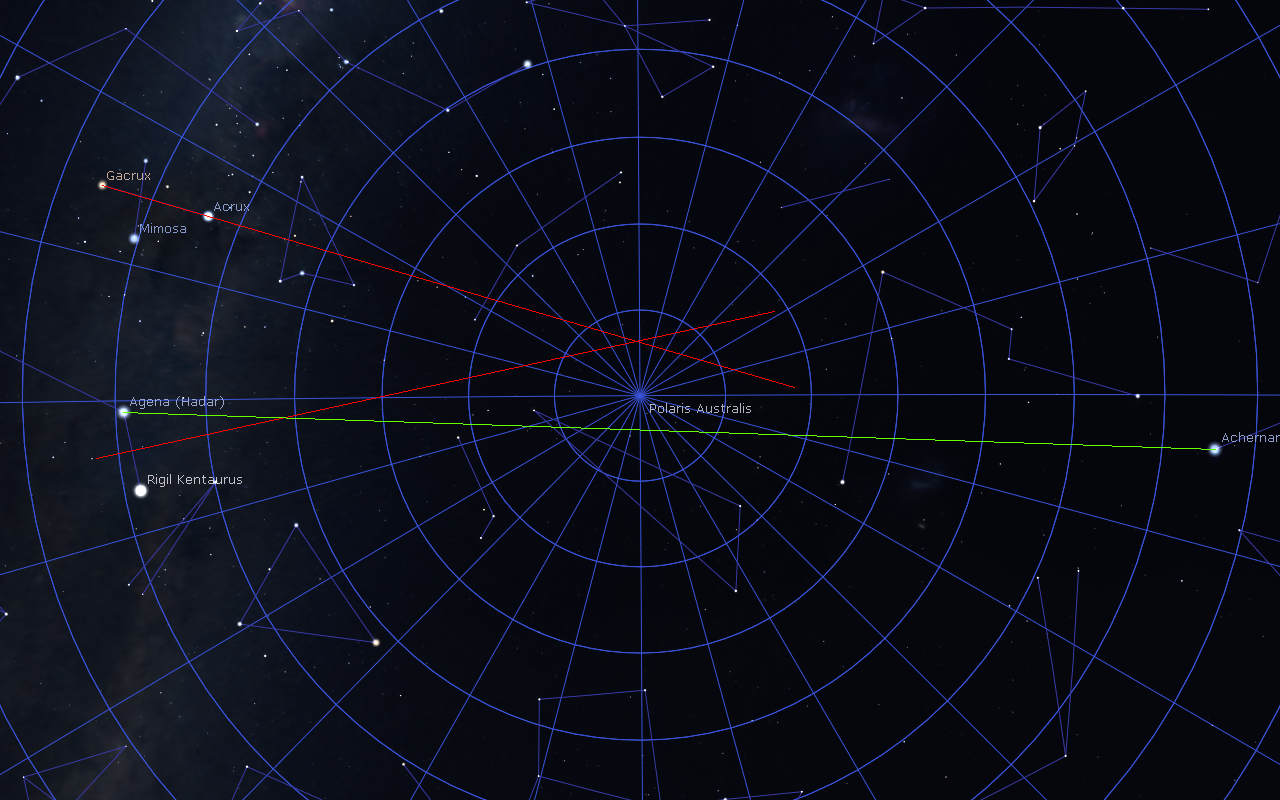
South celestial pole

The south celestial pole is visible only from the Southern Hemisphere. It lies in the dim constellation Octans, the Octant. Sigma Octantis is identified as the south pole star, more than one degree away from the pole, but with a magnitude of 5.5 it is barely visible on a clear night.

=== Method one: The Southern Cross ===
The south celestial pole can be located from the Southern Cross (Crux) and its two "pointer" stars α Centauri and β Centauri. Draw an imaginary line from γ Crucis to α Crucis—the two stars at the extreme ends of the long axis of the cross—and follow this line through the sky. Either go four-and-a-half times the distance of the long axis in the direction the narrow end of the cross points, or join the two pointer stars with a line, divide this line in half, then at right angles draw another imaginary line through the sky until it meets the line from the Southern Cross. This point is 5 or 6 degrees from the south celestial pole. Very few bright stars of importance lie between Crux and the pole itself, although the constellation Musca is fairly easily recognised immediately beneath Crux.

=== Method two: Canopus and Achernar ===
The second method uses Canopus (the second-brightest star in the sky) and Achernar. Make a large equilateral triangle using these stars for two of the corners. But where should the third corner go? It could be on either side of the line connecting Achernar and Canopus, and the wrong side will not lead to the pole. To find the correct side, imagine that Archernar and Canopus are both points on the circumference of a circle. The third corner of the equilateral triangle will also be on this circle. The corner should be placed clockwise from Achernar and anticlockwise from Canopus. The third imaginary corner will be the south celestial pole. If the opposite is done, the point will land in the middle of Eridanus, which isn't at the pole. If Canopus has not yet risen, the second-magnitude Alpha Pavonis can also be used to form the triangle with Achernar and the pole. In this case, go anticlockwise from Achernar instead of clockwise, form the triangle with Canopus, and the third point, the pole, will reveal itself. The wrong way will lead to Aquarius, which is very far away from the celestial pole.

=== Method three: The Magellanic Clouds ===
The third method is best for moonless and clear nights, as it uses two faint "clouds" in the Southern Sky. These are marked in astronomy books as the Large and Small Magellanic Clouds (the LMC and the SMC). These "clouds" are actually dwarf galaxies near the Milky Way. Make an equilateral triangle, the third point of which is the south celestial pole. Like before, the SMC, LMC, and the pole will all be points on an equilateral triangle on an imaginary circle. The pole should be placed clockwise from the SMC and anticlockwise from the LMC. Going in the wrong direction will land you in the constellation of Horologium instead.

=== Method four: Sirius and Canopus ===
A line from Sirius, the brightest star in the sky, through Canopus, the second-brightest, continued for the same distance lands within a couple of degrees of the pole. In other words, Canopus is halfway between Sirius and the pole.

== See also ==
- Celestial sphere
- Celestial equator
- Circumpolar star
- Orbital pole
- Polaris
- Pole star
- Poles of astronomical bodies
