= Declination =

Astronomical coordinate analogous to latitude

In astronomy, declination (abbreviated dec; symbol δ) is the angular distance from the celestial equator on the celestial sphere; when paired with right ascension, it forms the equatorial coordinate system. The declination angle is measured north (positive) or south (negative) of the celestial equator, lining up with the hour circle passing through the point in question.

Right ascension and declination as seen on the inside of the celestial sphere. The primary direction of the system is the vernal equinox, the ascending node of the ecliptic (red) on the celestial equator (blue). Declination is measured northward or southward from the celestial equator, along the hour circle passing through the point in question.

The word declination traces roots from (Latin, declinatio), meaning "bending away" or "bending down". It comes from the same root as the words incline ("bend forward") and recline ("bend backward").

In some 18th and 19th century astronomical texts, declination is given as North Pole Distance (N.P.D.), which is equivalent to 90 – (declination). For instance an object marked as declination −5 would have an N.P.D. of 95, and a declination of −90 (the south celestial pole) would have an N.P.D. of 180.

== Explanation ==
Declination in astronomy is comparable to geographic latitude, projected onto the celestial sphere, and right ascension is likewise comparable to longitude. Points north of the celestial equator have positive declinations, while those south have negative declinations. Any units of angular measure can be used for declination, but it is customarily measured in the degrees (°), minutes (′), and seconds (″) of sexagesimal measure, with 90° equivalent to a quarter circle. Declinations with magnitudes greater than 90° do not occur, because the poles are the northernmost and southernmost points of the celestial sphere.

An object at the

- celestial equator has a declination of 0°
- north celestial pole has a declination of +90°
- south celestial pole has a declination of −90°

The sign is customarily included whether positive or negative.

== Effects of precession ==
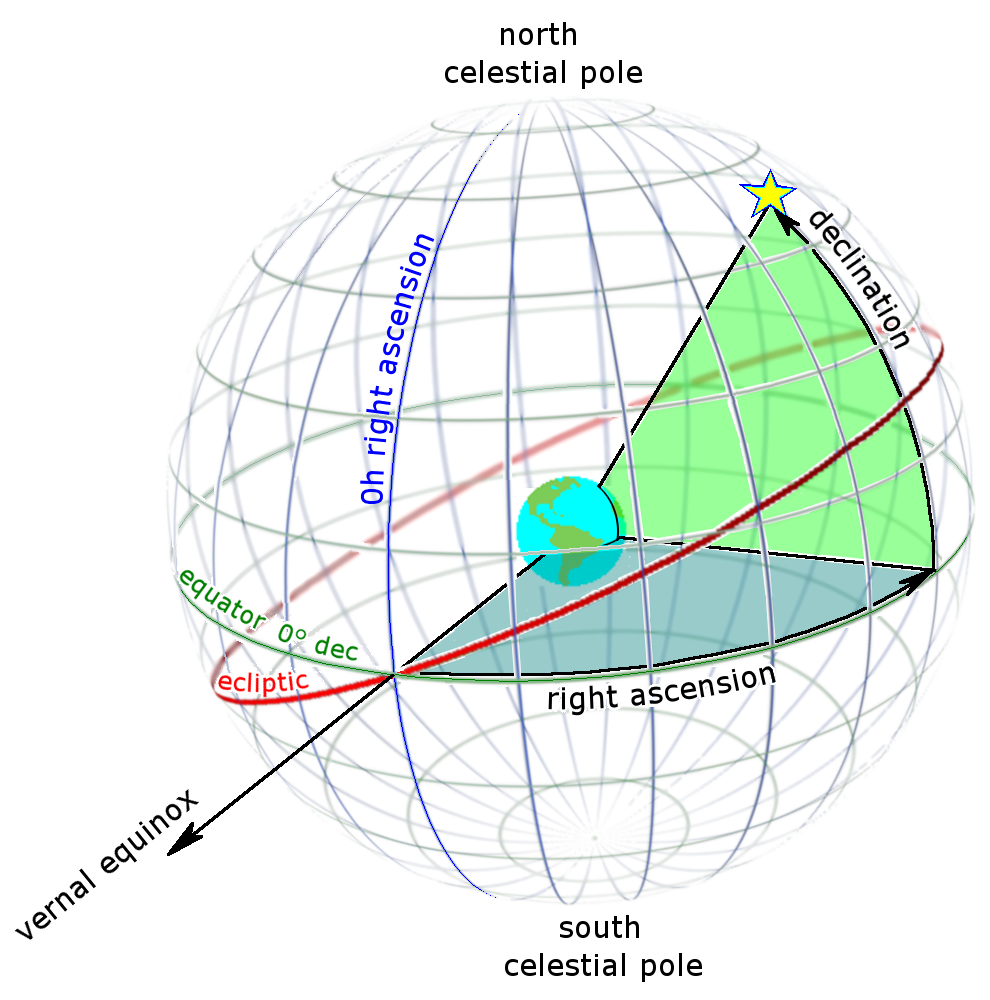
Right ascension (blue) and declination (green) as seen from outside the celestial sphere.

The Earth's axis rotates slowly westward about the poles of the ecliptic, completing one circuit in about 26,000 years. This effect, known as precession, causes the coordinates of stationary celestial objects to change continuously, if rather slowly. Therefore, equatorial coordinates (including declination) are inherently relative to the year of their observation, and astronomers specify them with reference to a particular year, known as an epoch. Coordinates from different epochs must be mathematically rotated to match each other, or to match a standard epoch.

The currently used standard epoch is J2000.0, which is January 1, 2000 at 12:00 TT. The prefix "J" indicates that it is a Julian epoch. Prior to J2000.0, astronomers used the successive Besselian Epochs B1875.0, B1900.0, and B1950.0.

== Stars ==
A star's direction remains nearly fixed due to its vast distance, but its right ascension and declination do change gradually due to precession of the equinoxes and proper motion, and cyclically due to annual parallax. The declinations of Solar System objects change very rapidly compared to those of stars, due to orbital motion and close proximity.

As seen from locations in the Earth's Northern Hemisphere, celestial objects with declinations greater than 90° − φ (where φ = observer's latitude) appear to circle daily around the celestial pole without dipping below the horizon, and are therefore called circumpolar stars. This similarly occurs in the Southern Hemisphere for objects with declinations less (i.e. more negative) than −90° − φ (where φ is always a negative number for southern latitudes). An extreme example is the pole star which has a declination near to +90°, so is circumpolar as seen from anywhere in the Northern Hemisphere except very close to the equator.

Circumpolar stars never dip below the horizon. Conversely, there are other stars that never rise above the horizon, as seen from any given point on the Earth's surface (except extremely close to the equator. Upon flat terrain, the distance has to be within approximately 2 km, although this varies based upon the observer's altitude and surrounding terrain). Generally, if a star whose declination is δ is circumpolar for some observer (where δ is either positive or negative), then a star whose declination is −δ never rises above the horizon, as seen by the same observer. (This neglects the effect of atmospheric refraction.) Likewise, if a star is circumpolar for an observer at latitude φ, then it never rises above the horizon as seen by an observer at latitude −φ.

Neglecting atmospheric refraction, for an observer at the equator, declination is always 0° at east and west points of the horizon. At the north point, it is 90° − |φ|, and at the south point, −90° + |φ|. From the poles, declination is uniform around the entire horizon, approximately 0°.

Stars visible by latitude
Observer's latitude (°)	Declination		
Observer's latitude (°)	of circumpolar stars (°)	of non-circumpolar stars (°)	of stars not visible (°)
Observer's latitude (°)	+ for north latitude, − for south		− for north latitude, + for south
90 (Pole)	90 to 0	—N/a	0 to 90
66.5 (Arctic/Antarctic Circle)	90 to 23.5	+23.5 to −23.5	23.5 to 90
45 (midpoint)	90 to 45	+45 to −45	45 to 90
23.5 (Tropic of Cancer/Capricorn)	90 to 66.5	+66.5 to −66.5	66.5 to 90
0 (Equator)	—N/a	+90 to −90	—N/a

Non-circumpolar stars are visible only during certain days or seasons of the year.

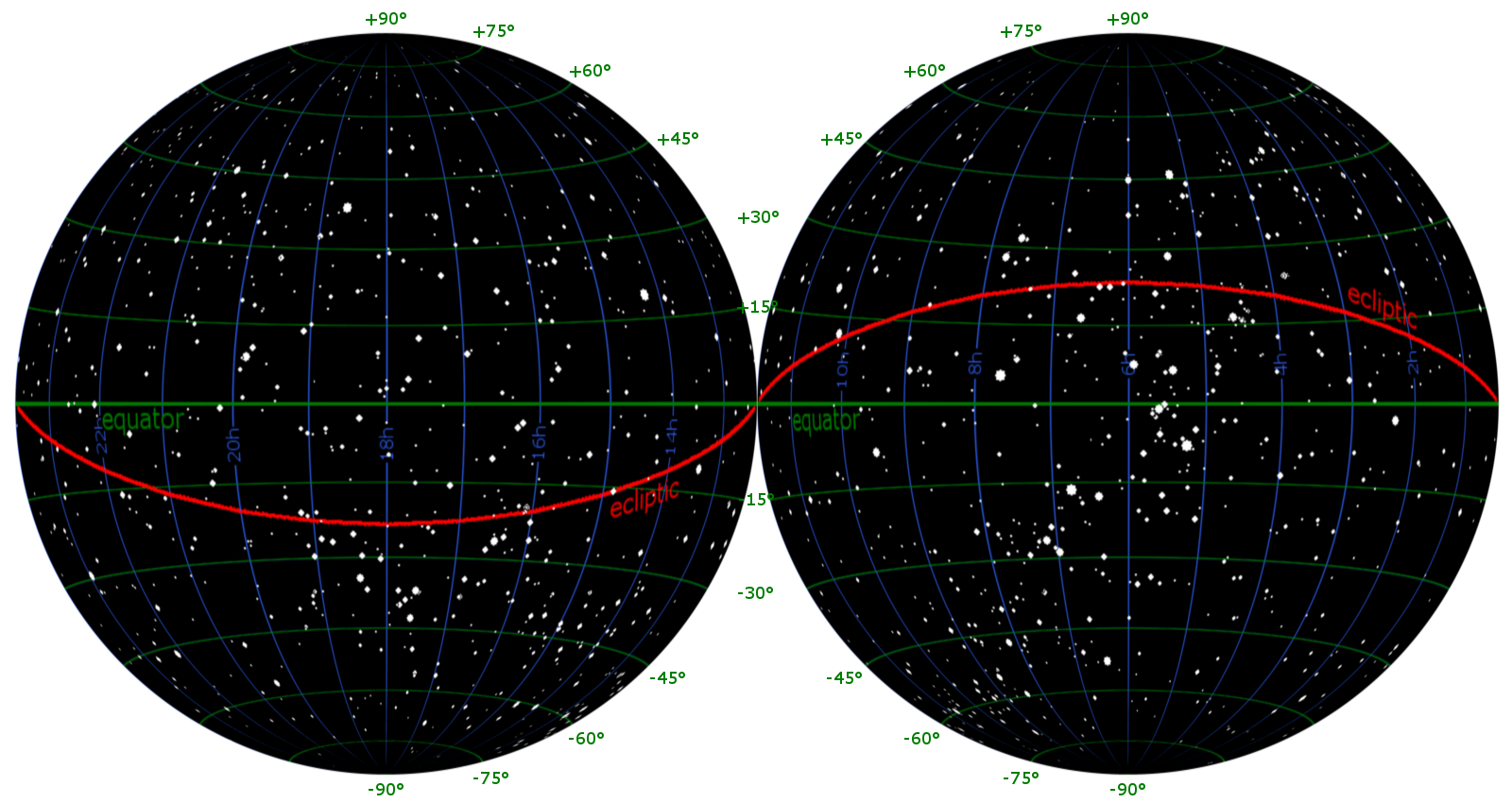
The night sky, divided into two halves. Declination (green) begins at the equator (green) and is positive northward (towards the top), negative southward (towards the bottom). The lines of right ascension (blue) divide the sky into great circles, here 1 hour apart.

== Sun ==
The Sun's declination varies with the seasons. As seen from arctic or antarctic latitudes, the Sun is circumpolar near the local summer solstice, leading to the phenomenon of it being above the horizon at midnight, which is called midnight sun. Likewise, near the local winter solstice, the Sun remains below the horizon all day, which is called polar night.

== Relation to latitude ==
When an object is directly overhead its declination is almost always within 0.01 degrees of the observer's latitude; it would be exactly equal except for two complications.

The first complication applies to all celestial objects: the object's declination equals the observer's astronomical latitude, but the term "latitude" ordinarily means geodetic latitude, which is the latitude on maps and GPS devices. In the continental United States and surrounding area, the difference (the vertical deflection) is typically a few arcseconds (1 arcsecond = 1/3600 of a degree) but can be as great as 41 arcseconds.

The second complication is that, assuming no deflection of the vertical, "overhead" means perpendicular to the ellipsoid at observer's location, but the perpendicular line does not pass through the center of the Earth; almanacs provide declinations measured at the center of the Earth. (An ellipsoid is an approximation to sea level that is mathematically manageable).

== See also ==
- Celestial coordinate system
- Ecliptic
- Equatorial coordinate system
- Geographic coordinate system
- Lunar standstill
- Position of the Sun
- Right ascension
- Setting circles
