= Gaia catalogues =

Catalogues consisting of data from the Gaia mission

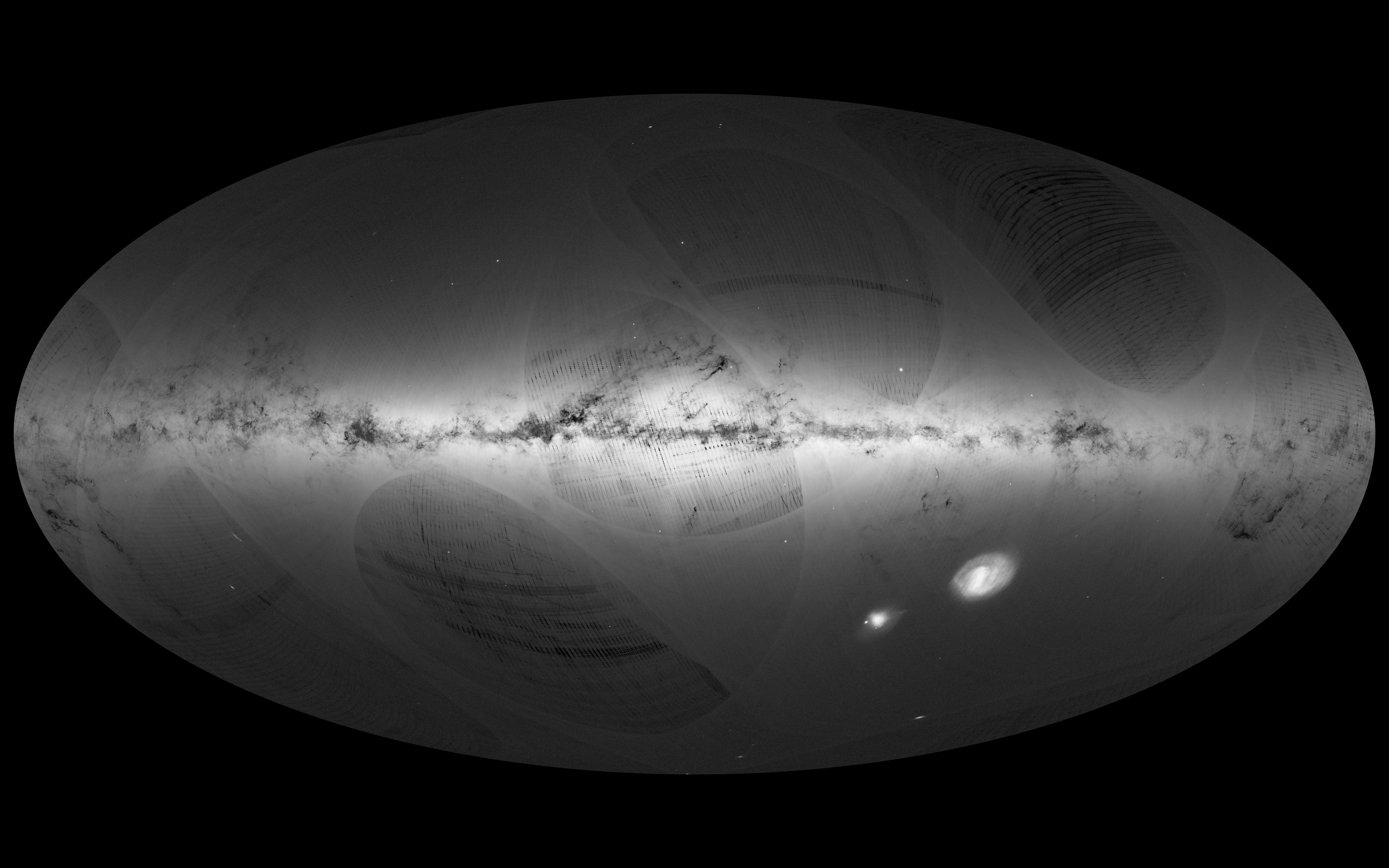
An all-sky view of stars in the Milky Way and neighbouring galaxies, based on the first year of observations by Gaia, from July 2014 to September 2015. Map shows the density of stars observed by Gaia in each portion of the sky. Brighter regions indicate denser concentrations of stars, while darker regions correspond to patches of the sky where fewer stars are observed.

The Gaia catalogues are star catalogues created using the results obtained by Gaia space telescope. The catalogues are released in stages that will contain increasing amounts of information; the early releases also miss some stars, especially fainter stars located in dense star fields. Data from every data release can be accessed at the Gaia archive.

== Initial Gaia Source List ==
The Initial Gaia Source List (IGSL) is a star catalogue of 1.2 billion objects created in support of the Gaia mission. The mission should have delivered a catalogue based entirely on its own data. For the first catalogue, Gaia DR1, a way was needed to be able to assign the observations to an object and to compare them with the objects from other star catalogues. For this purpose, a separate catalog of objects from several other catalogues was compiled, which roughly represents the state of knowledge of astronomy at the beginning of the Gaia mission.

=== Attitude Star Catalog ===
The Attitude Star Catalog is a subset of the IGSL, required for the first approximation in the iterative evaluation of the Gaia data. A first version was created in 2013, a more refined version in April 2014. In total, the Attitude Star Catalog contains 8,173,331 entries with information on position, proper motion and magnitude. Starting with Gaia DR2, the Attitude Star Catalog was replaced with a new list generated from the Gaia Main Data Base (MDB), using the same criteria.

=== Gaia Spectrophotometric Standard Star Catalogue ===
IGSL contains a list of about 200 stars of different spectral classes and magnitudes needed for calibration of the photometric measurements. It is the result of the Gaia Spectrophotometric Standard Stars Survey (SPSS), a selection of stars using Earth-based data in advance of the Gaia mission. Previous catalogues for calibrating magnitudes could not be used for the mission because many of these objects are too bright for Gaia to detect. It was anticipated that some of the stars selected may be previously unrecognized doubles or variable stars that would need to be deleted from the catalogue; for this reason the list contains more stars than necessary. For Gaia EDR3 (Early Data Release 3), a selection was made from more than 100,000 objects that were used for the calibration. These are well-observed objects selected according to Stetson Secondary Standards, but only Gaia data were used.

=== Gaia Initial Quasar Catalog ===
A list of quasars based on the Large Quasar Astrometric Catalog was prepared for IGSL. This in turn goes back to the Sloan Digital Sky Survey. From the more than one million objects, a selection of 150,000 quasars was made, which are in the region of Gaia's magnitude limit. The selected objects are already well observed and documented. In most cases, quasars are very far away, so that their proper motions and parallaxes are negligibly small.

=== Gaia Ecliptic Pole Catalogue ===
Gaia Ecliptic Pole Catalogue (GEPC) was created for measuring the poles. The southern part of the catalogue was compiled from observations made with the MPG/ESO telescope at the Max Planck Institute for Astronomy in La Silla, Chile. It contains precise positions, UBV I photometry for the southern field and the corresponding magnitudes. The northern part was created with the Canada–France–Hawaii Telescope on Mauna Kea, Hawaii.

The GEPC v3.0 catalogue contains 612,946 objects from a field of one square degree each at the north and south poles. The north pole is relatively sparse and contains 164,468 objects, while the south pole is still in the region of the Large Magellanic Cloud and contains 448,478 objects. The GEPC data was needed right at the beginning of the mission for the initial calibration. The commissioning phase of the Gaia space probe ended on July 18, 2014. This was followed by a calibration phase of 28 days, during which the ecliptic poles were measured intensively. During this time, Gaia was operated in Ecliptic Poles Scan Law mode (EPSL), in which the two poles were measured twice during each revolution. The initial catalogue was used for Gaia DR1 to match Gaia-found objects to previous star catalogues.

== Gaia DR1 ==
Gaia DR1, the first data release based on 14 months of observations made through September 2015, took place on 13 September 2016. It includes "positions and magnitudes in a single photometric band for 1.1 billion stars using only Gaia data, positions, parallaxes and proper motions for more than 2 million stars" based on a combination of Gaia and Tycho-2 data for those objects in both catalogues, "light curves and characteristics for about 3000 variable stars, and positions and magnitudes for more than 2000 extragalactic sources used to define the celestial reference frame".

== Gaia DR2 ==
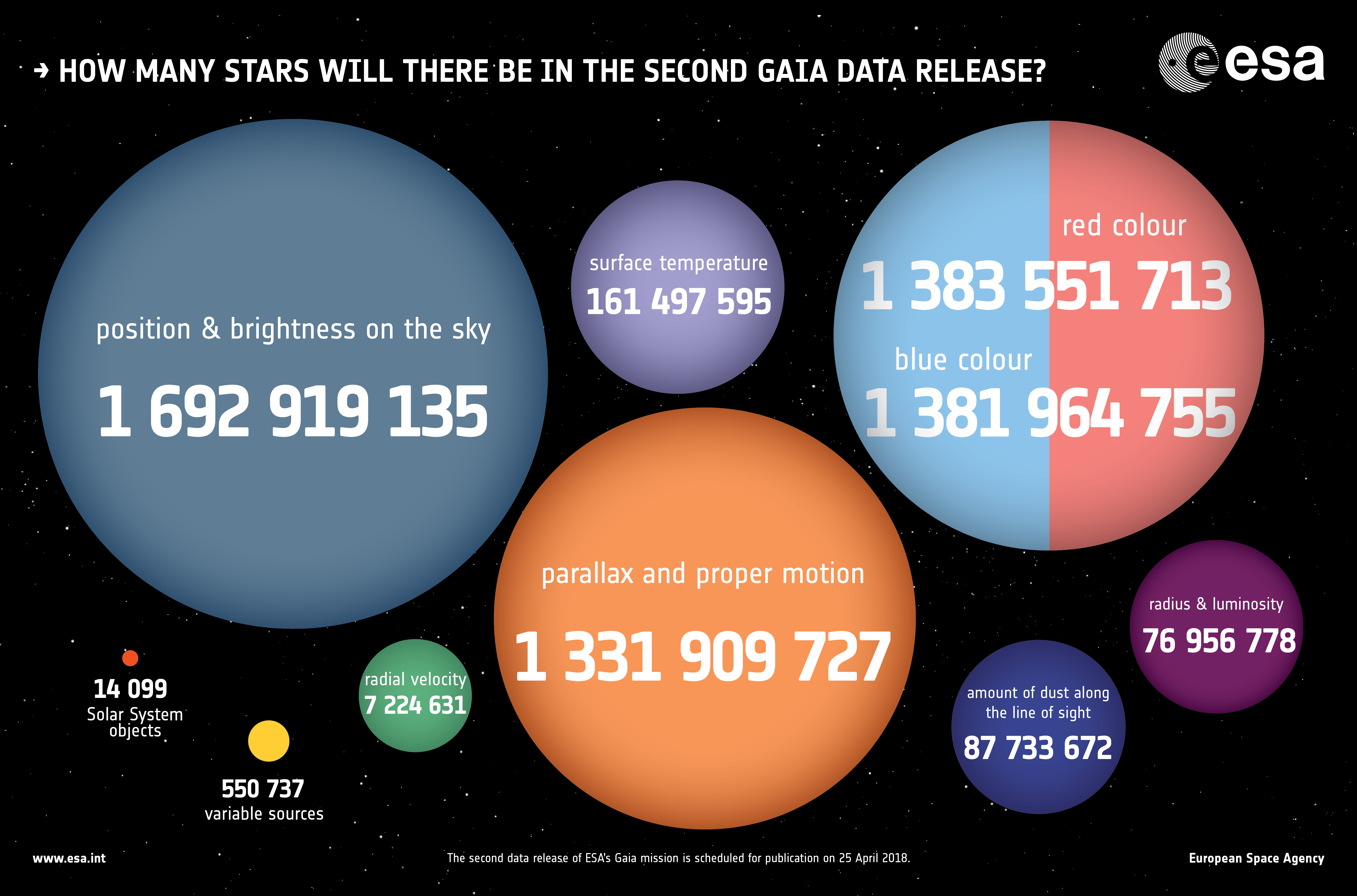
Stars in Gaia DR2

The second data release (DR2), which occurred on 25 April 2018, is based on 22 months of observations made between 25 July 2014 and 23 May 2016. It includes positions, parallaxes and proper motions for about 1.3 billion stars and positions of an additional 300 million stars in the magnitude range g = 3–20, red and blue photometric data for about 1.1 billion stars and single colour photometry for an additional 400 million stars, and median radial velocities for about 7 million stars between magnitude 4 and 13. It also contains data for over 14,000 selected Solar System objects.

The coordinates in DR2 use the second Gaia celestial reference frame (Gaia–CRF2), which is based on observations of 492,006 sources believed to be quasars and has been described as "the first full-fledged optical realisation of the ICRS ... built only on extragalactic sources." Comparison of the positions of 2,843 sources common to Gaia–CRF2 and a preliminary version of the ICRF3 shows a global agreement of 20 to 30 μas, although individual sources may differ by several mas. Since the data processing procedure links individual Gaia observations with particular sources on the sky, in some cases the association of observations with sources will be different in the second data release. Consequently, DR2 uses different source identification numbers than DR1. A number of issues have been identified with the DR2 data, including small systematic errors in astrometry and significant contamination of radial velocity values in crowded star fields, which may affect some one percent of the radial velocity values. Ongoing work should resolve these issues in future releases. A guide for researchers using Gaia DR2, which collected "all information, tips and tricks, pitfalls, caveats and recommendations relevant to" DR2, was prepared by the Gaia Helpdesk in December 2019.

== Gaia DR3 ==
Due to uncertainties in the data pipeline, the third data release, based on 34 months of observations, has been split into two parts so that data that was ready first, was released first. The first part, EDR3 (Early Data Release 3), consisting of improved positions, parallaxes and proper motions, was released on 3 December 2020. The coordinates in EDR3 use a new version of the Gaia celestial reference frame (Gaia–CRF3), based on observations of 1,614,173 extragalactic sources, 2,269 of which were common to radio sources in the third revision of the International Celestial Reference Frame (ICRF3). Included is the Gaia Catalogue of Nearby Stars (GCNS), containing 331,312 stars within (nominally) 100 parsecs (330 light-years).

Gaia EDR3 G-band magnitude distribution percentiles are as follows, with the median magnitude (50th percentile) being 19.7.

| Percentile | Apparent magnitude |
|---|---|
| 0.14% | 11.7 |
| 2.28% | 15.1 |
| 15.87% | 17.9 |
| 50% | 19.7 |
| 84.13% | 20.6 |
| 97.73% | 21 |
| 99.87% | 21.5 |

The full DR3, published on 13 June 2022, includes the EDR3 data plus Solar System data; variability information; results for non-single stars, for quasars, and for extended objects; astrophysical parameters; and a special data set, the Gaia Andromeda Photometric Survey (GAPS), providing a photometric time series for about 1 million sources located in a 5.5-degree radius field centered on the Andromeda galaxy. The release dates of EDR3 and DR3 were delayed by the effects of the COVID-19 pandemic on the Gaia Data Processing and Analysis Consortium.

Version 25.1 of the open-source planetarium software Stellarium, released in March 2025, was the first version of Stellarium to use data from the Gaia DR3 catalog.

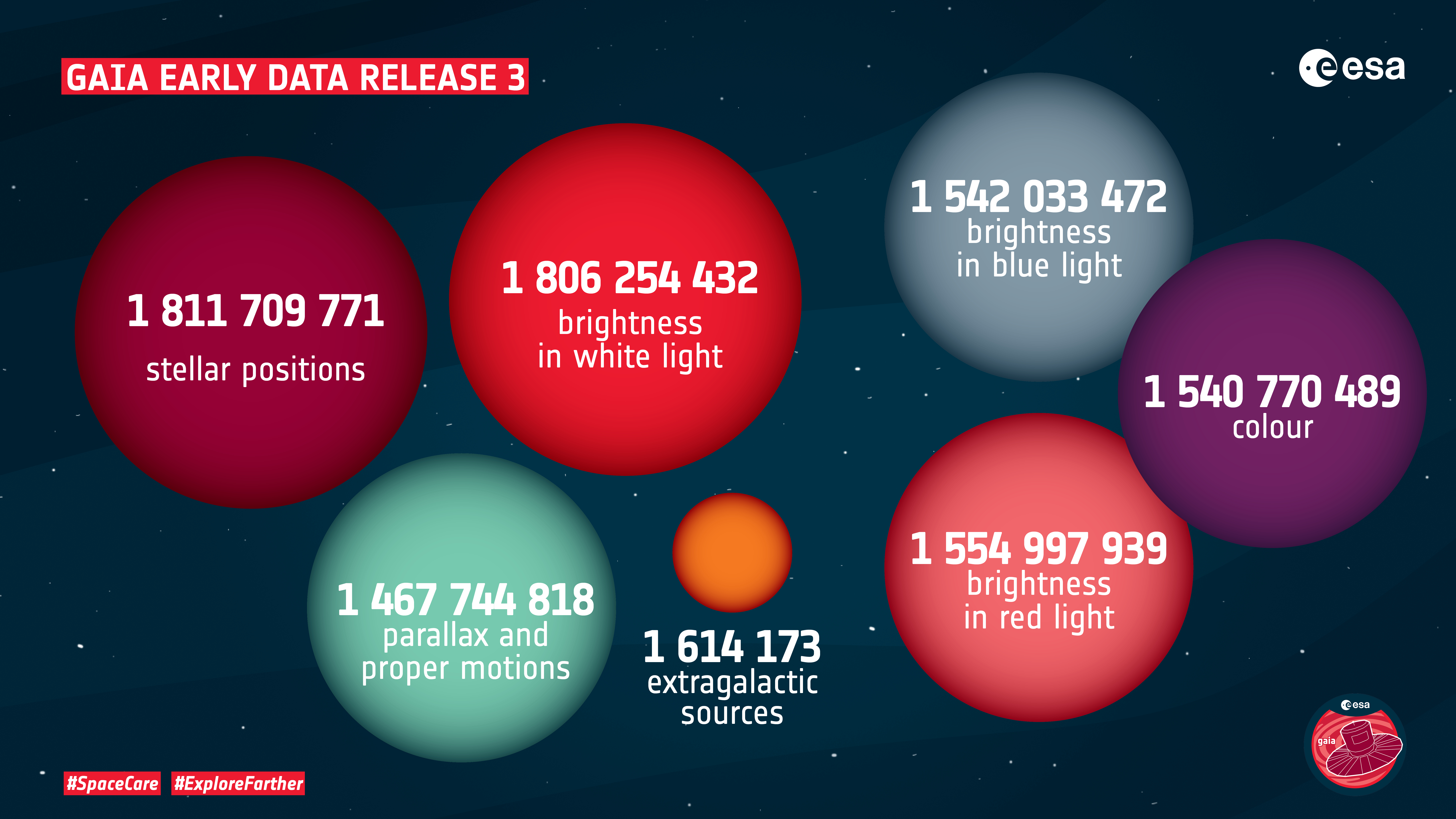
Stars and other objects in Gaia Early Data Release 3

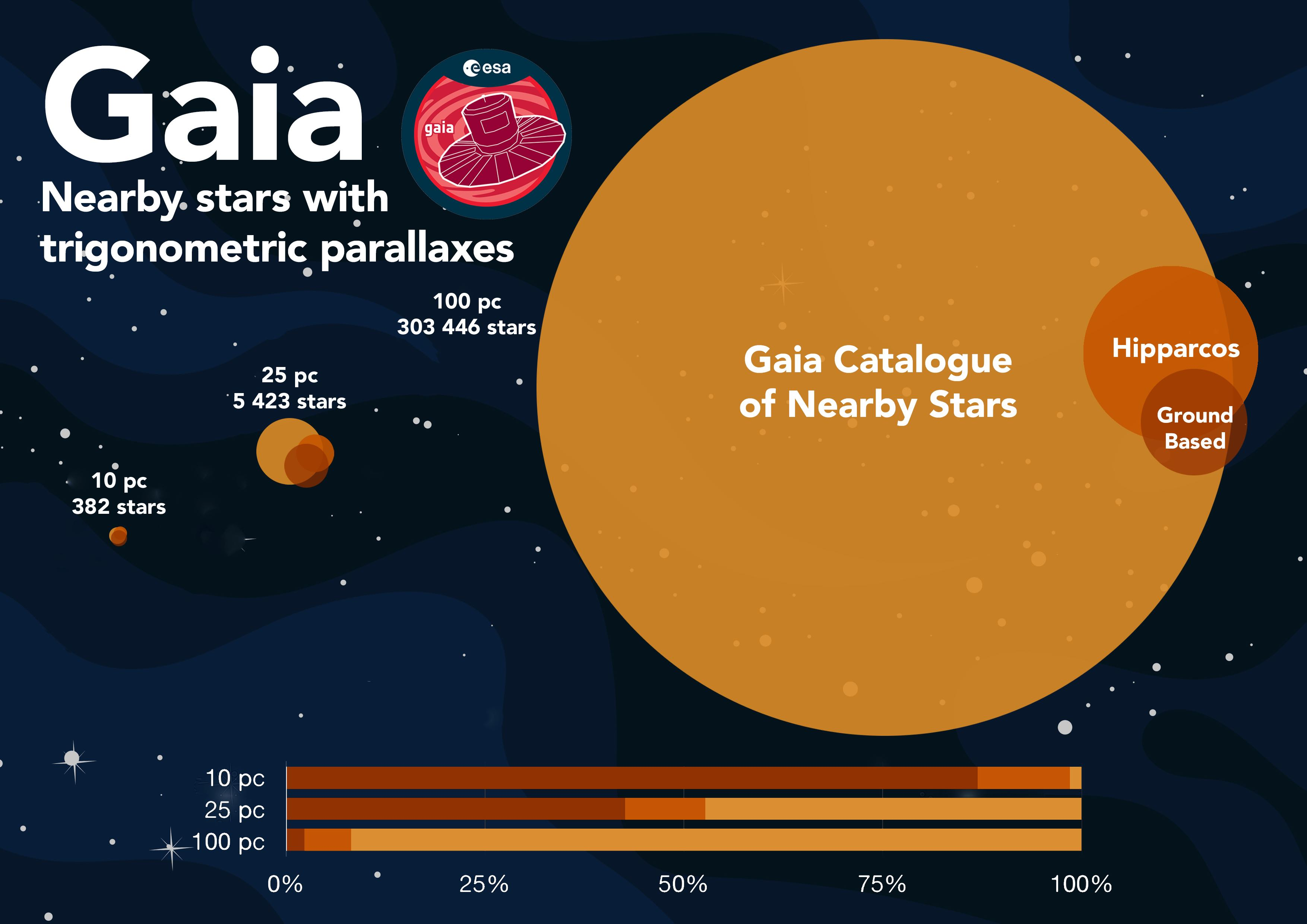
Gaia Catalogue of Nearby Stars

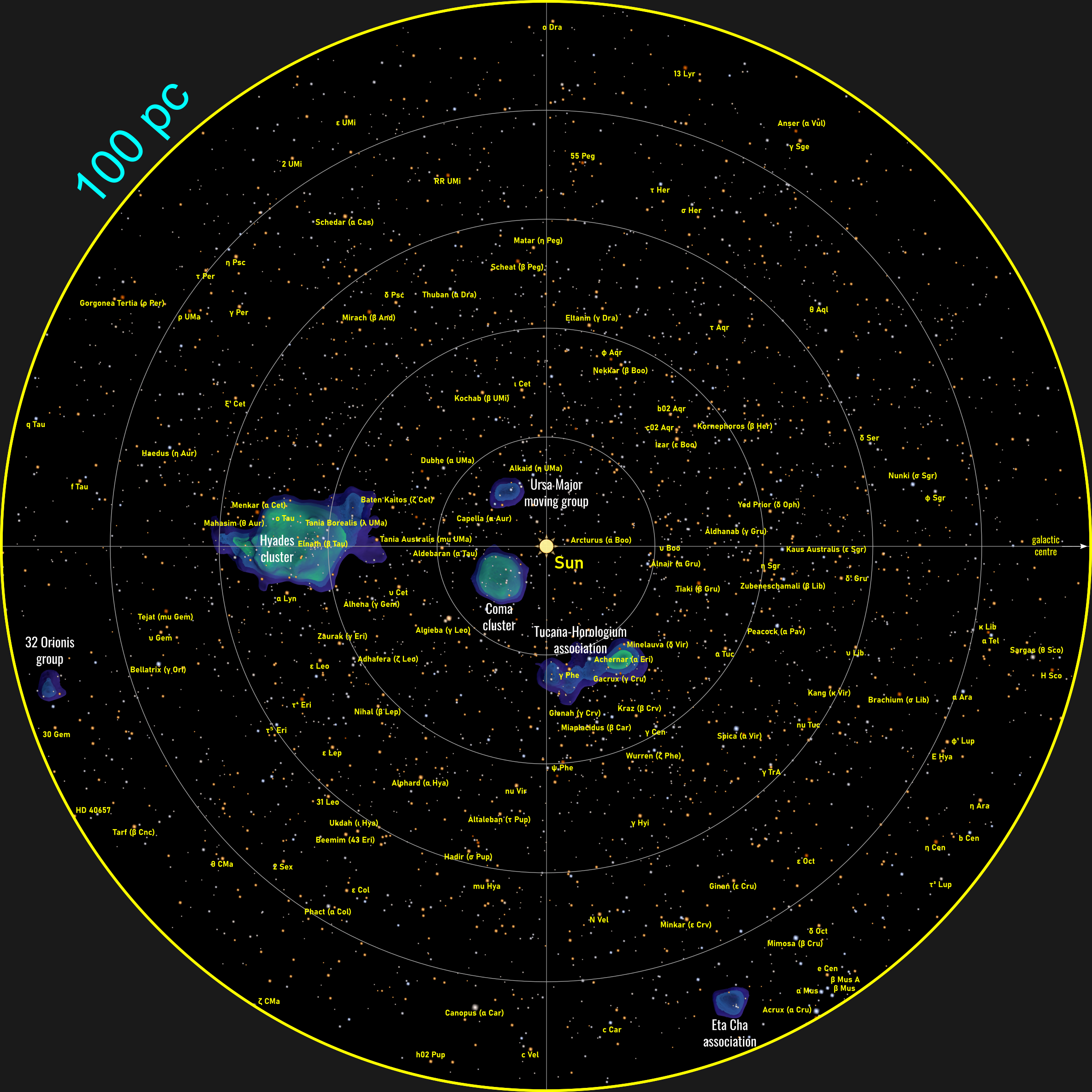
Star density maps of the Gaia Catalogue of Nearby Stars. The Sun is located at the centre of both maps. The regions with higher density of stars are shown; these correspond with known star clusters (Hyades and Coma Berenices) and moving groups.

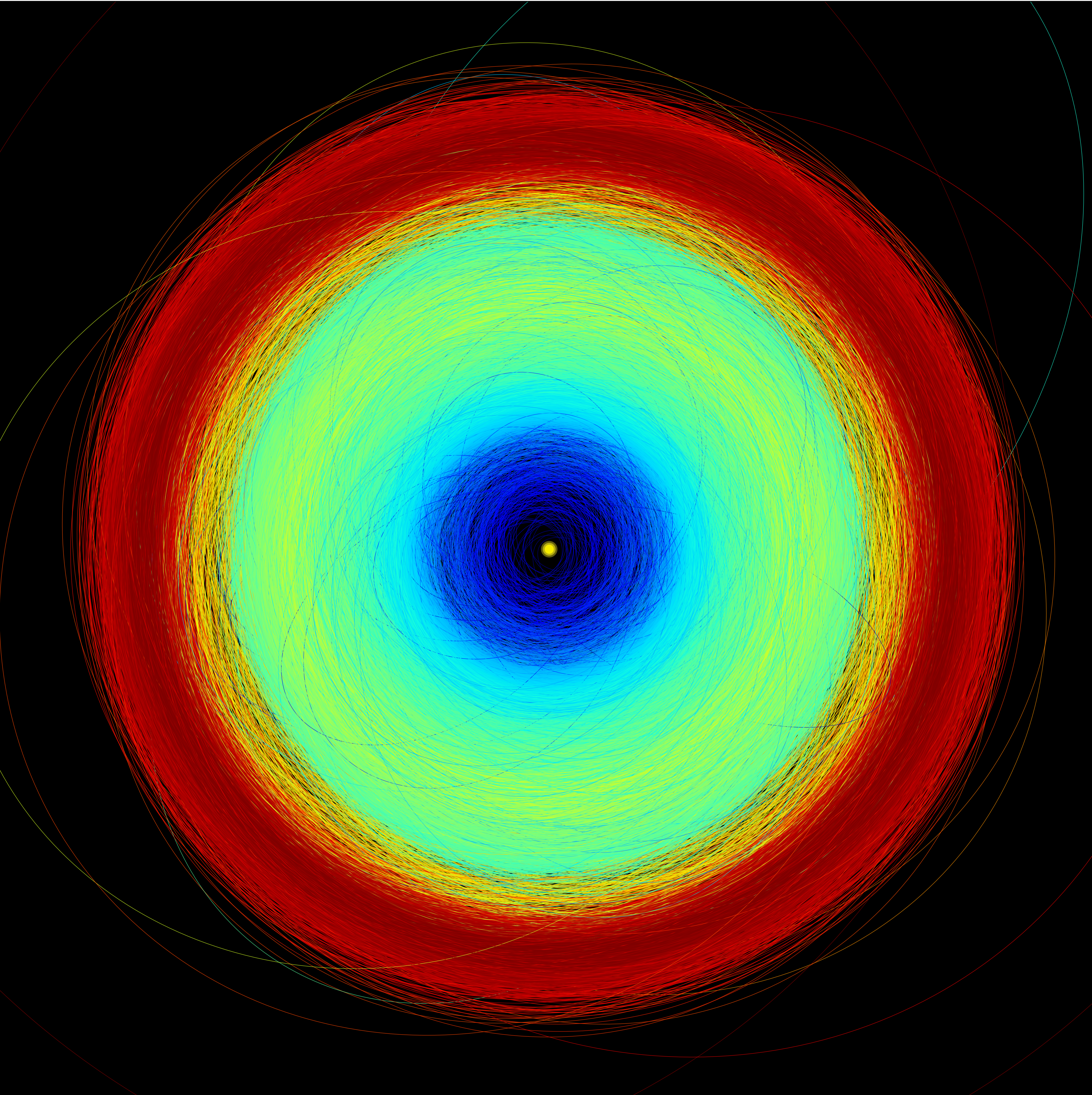
This image shows the orbits of the more than 150 000 asteroids in DR3, from the inner parts of the Solar System to the Trojan asteroids at the distance of Jupiter, with different colour codes.

== Gaia Focused Product Release ==
The Gaia Focused Product Release from October 2023 offered 5 new data sets focusing on particular areas of astronomy:

- Astrometry and photometry from engineering images taken in the Omega Centauri region.
- The first results of quasars' environment analysis for gravitational lenses search.
- Extended radial velocity epoch data for Long Period Variables.
- Diffuse Interstellar Bands from aggregated RVS spectra.
- Updated astrometry for Solar System objects.
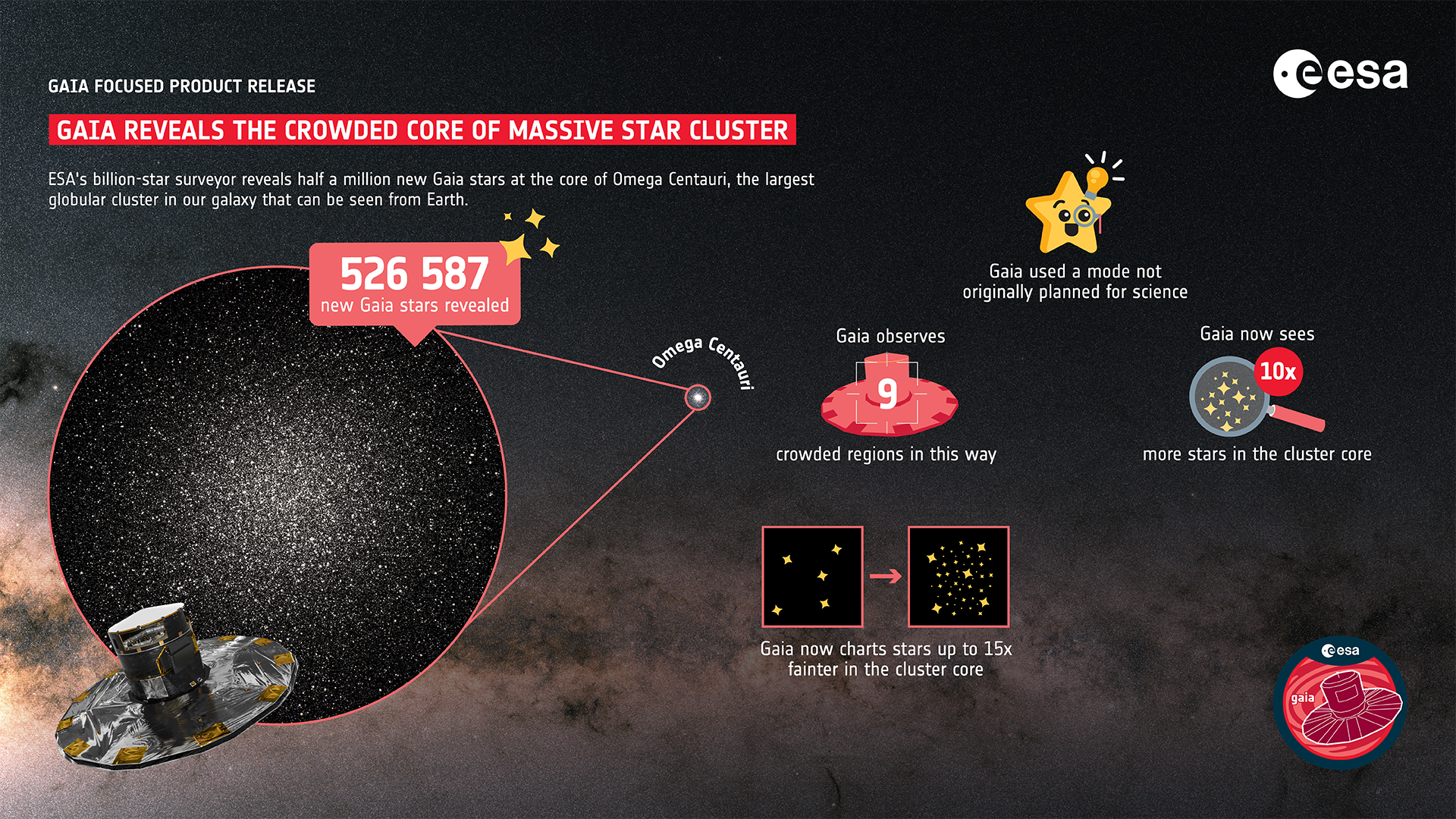
Focused Product Release

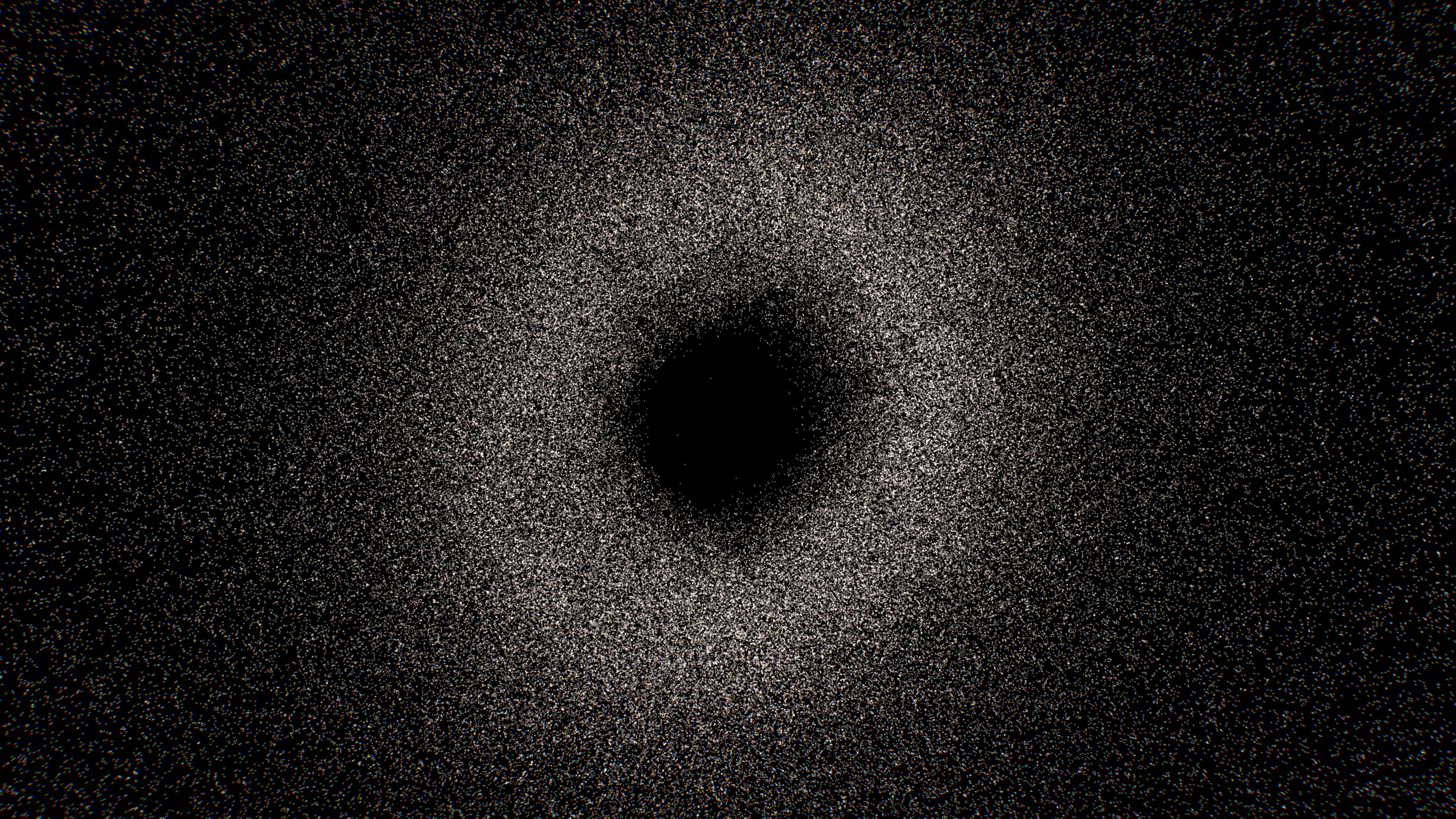
Gaia view of Omega Centauri from Gaia’s Data Release 3 in 2022

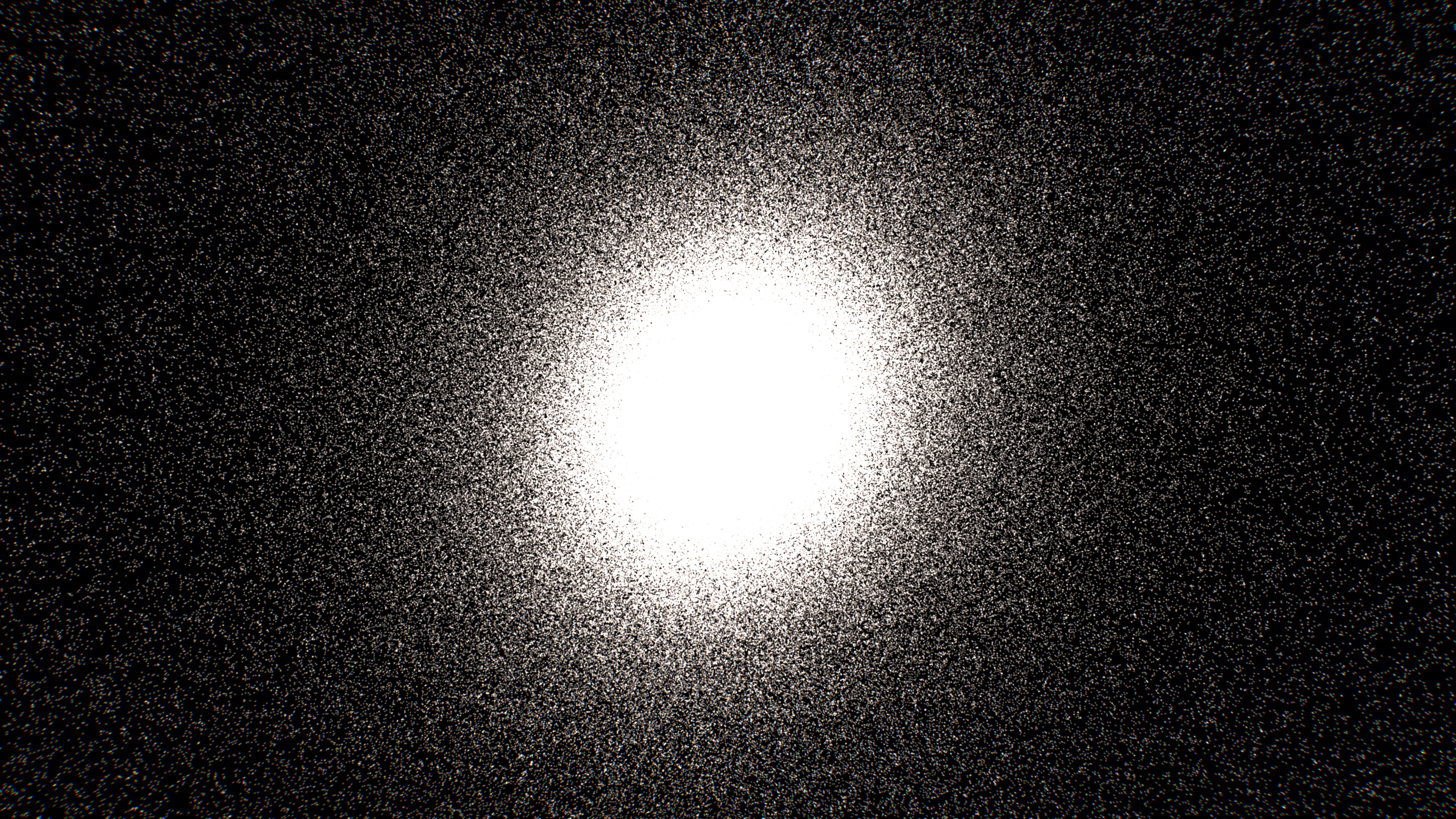
Gaia view of Omega Centauri from Gaia’s Focused Product Release in 2023

== Gaia DR4 ==
The full data release for the five-year nominal mission, DR4, will include full astrometric, photometric and radial-velocity catalogues, variable-star and non-single-star solutions, source classifications plus multiple astrophysical parameters for stars, unresolved binaries, galaxies and quasars, an exo-planet list and epoch and transit data for all sources. The individual epoch and transit data will allow manual verification of automated solutions, as well as comparison against, and combined analysis with, non-Gaia data. Systematic errors are expected to be substantially reduced. Most measurements in DR4 are expected to be 1.7 times more precise than DR2; proper motions will be 4.5 times more precise. DR4 is planned to be released on 2 December 2026.

== Gaia DR5 ==
The last catalogue, DR5, will consist of all data collected during the lifespan of the mission. It will be 1.4 times more precise than DR4, while proper motions will be 2.8 times more precise than DR4. It will be published no earlier than the end of 2030.

== Gaia Archive ==
The Gaia Archive is a catalogue that contains positions and brightnesses for 1.7 billion stars, including distances and proper motions for more than 1.3 billion stars.

An outreach application, Gaia Sky, has been developed to explore the galaxy in three dimensions using Gaia data.

== See also ==
- Data Processing and Analysis Consortium
- List of astronomical catalogues
