= DPAC =

DPAC may refer to:

== Organisations ==
=== Government ===
Australia:

- Department of Premier and Cabinet (New South Wales)
- Department of the Premier and Cabinet (Queensland)
- Department of Premier and Cabinet, Victoria

Albania:

- Civil Aviation Authority (Albania) (formerly Drejtoria e Pergjithshme e Aviacionit Civil)

=== Other organisations ===
- The Data Processing and Analysis Consortium for the ESA's Gaia space telescope
- Disabled People Against Cuts, UK anti-austerity campaign group

== Places ==
United States:

- Denver Performing Arts Complex, Colorado
- Durham Performing Arts Center, North Carolina
