= Gaia (spacecraft) =

ESA space observatory for astrometry (2013–2025)

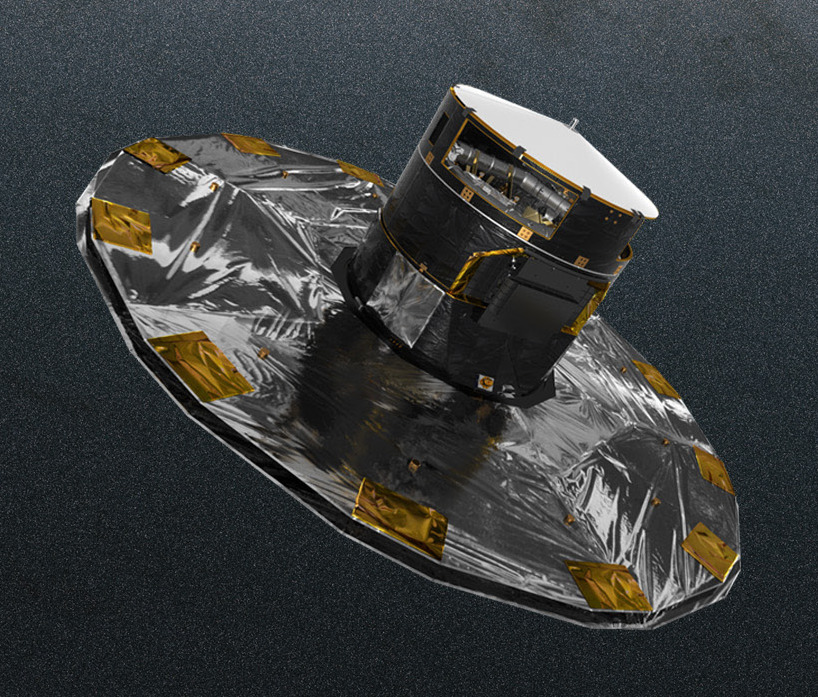
- Artist's impression of the Gaia spacecraft
- Names: 2015 HP_{116} (Note: Gaia was initially mistaken by Pan-STARRS for a near-Earth asteroid that is gravitationally bound to the Earth-Moon system before its identity as a spacecraft was confirmed.)
- Mission type: Astrometric observatory
- Operator: ESA
- COSPAR ID: 2013-074A
- SATCAT no.: 39479
- Website: www.esa.int/Science_Exploration/Space_Science/Gaia
- Mission duration: 11 years, 3 months and 8 days

Spacecraft properties
- Manufacturer: EADS Astrium; e2v Technologies
- Launch mass: 2,029 kg (4,473 lb)
- Dry mass: 1,392 kg (3,069 lb)
- Payload mass: 710 kg (1,570 lb)
- Dimensions: 4.6 m × 2.3 m (15.1 ft × 7.5 ft)
- Power: 1,910 watts

Start of mission
- Launch date: 19 December 2013, 09:12:14 UTC
- Rocket: Soyuz ST-B/Fregat-MT
- Launch site: Kourou ELS
- Contractor: Arianespace

End of mission
- Disposal: Decommissioned
- Deactivated: 27 March 2025

Orbital parameters
- Reference system: Sun–Earth L_{2}
- Regime: Lissajous orbit
- Periapsis altitude: 263,000 km (163,000 mi)
- Apoapsis altitude: 707,000 km (439,000 mi)
- Period: 180 days
- Epoch: 2014

Main telescope
- Type: Three-mirror anastigmat
- Diameter: 1.45 m × 0.5 m (4 ft 9 in × 1 ft 8 in)
- Collecting area: 0.7 m^{2}
- Wavelengths: Visible

Transponders
- Band: S band (TT&C support); X band (data acquisition)
- Bandwidth: a few kbit/s down & up (S band); 3–8 Mbit/s download (X band)

Instruments
- ASTRO: Astrometric instrument; BP/RP: Photometric instrument; RVS: Radial velocity spectrometer
- Contemporary ESA insignia (2010s) Horizon 2000 Plus (Science Programme)

Gaia is a retired space observatory of the European Space Agency (ESA) that was launched in 2013 and operated until March 2025. The spacecraft was designed for astrometry: measuring the positions, distances and motions of stars with unprecedented precision, and the positions of exoplanets by measuring attributes about the stars they orbit such as their apparent magnitude and colour. As of 2026, the mission data processing continues, aiming to construct the largest and most precise 3D space catalogue ever made, totalling approximately 1 billion astronomical objects, mainly stars, but also planets, comets, asteroids and quasars, among others.

To study the precise position and motion of its target objects, the spacecraft monitored each of them about 70 times over the five years of the nominal mission (2014–2019), and about as many during its extension. Due to its detectors degrading more slowly than initially expected, the data acquisition phase of the mission was given an extension, lasting until March 27, 2025, when scientists at the ESA switched off Gaia after more than a decade of service. Gaia targeted objects brighter than magnitude 20 in a broad photometric band that covered the extended visual range between near-UV and near infrared; such objects represent approximately 1% of the Milky Way population. Additionally, Gaia was expected to detect thousands to tens of thousands of Jupiter-sized exoplanets beyond the Solar System using astrometry, 500,000 quasars outside this galaxy and tens of thousands of known and new asteroids and comets within the Solar System.

Even though the telescope was decommissioned in 2025, the Gaia mission continues to analyse the collected data to create a precise three-dimensional map of astronomical objects throughout the Milky Way and map their motions, which encode the origin and subsequent evolution of the Milky Way. The spectrophotometric measurements provide detailed physical properties of all stars observed, characterising their luminosity, effective temperature, gravity and elemental composition. This massive stellar census is providing the basic observational data to analyse a wide range of important questions related to the origin, structure and evolutionary history of the Milky Way Galaxy. As of 2026, the last scheduled data release is not expected before the end of 2030.

The successor to the Hipparcos mission (1989–1993), Gaia is part of ESA's Horizon 2000+ long-term scientific program. Gaia was launched on 19 December 2013 by Arianespace using a Soyuz ST-B/Fregat-MT rocket flying from Kourou in French Guiana. The spacecraft operated in a Lissajous orbit around the Sun–Earth L_{2} Lagrangian point. The science observation officially ended on 15 January 2025.

== History ==
The Gaia space telescope had its roots in ESA's Hipparcos mission (1989–1993). Its mission was proposed in October 1993 by Lennart Lindegren (Lund Observatory, Lund University, Sweden) and Michael Perryman (ESA) in response to a call for proposals for ESA's Horizon Plus long-term scientific programme. It was adopted by ESA's Science Programme Committee as cornerstone mission number 6 on 13 October 2000, and the B2 phase of the project was authorised on 9 February 2006, with EADS Astrium taking responsibility for the hardware. The name "Gaia" was originally derived as an acronym for Global Astrometric Interferometer for Astrophysics. This reflected the optical technique of interferometry that was originally planned for use on the spacecraft. While the working method evolved during studies and the acronym is no longer applicable, the name Gaia remained to provide continuity with the project.

The total cost of the mission is around €740 million (~ $1 billion), including the manufacture, launch and ground operations. Gaia was completed two years behind schedule and 16% above its initial budget, mostly due to the difficulties encountered in polishing Gaia's ten silicon carbide mirrors and assembling and testing the focal plane camera system.

== Objectives ==
The Gaia space mission has the following objectives:

- To determine the intrinsic luminosity of a star requires knowledge of its distance. One of the few ways to achieve this without physical assumptions is through the star's parallax, but atmospheric effects and instrumental biases degrade the precision of parallax measurements. For instance, Cepheid variables are used as standard candles to measure distances to galaxies, but their own distances are poorly known. Thus, quantities depending on them, such as the speed of expansion of the universe, remain inaccurate.
- Observations of the faintest objects will provide a more complete view of the stellar luminosity function. Gaia will observe 1 billion stars and other bodies, representing 1% of such bodies in the Milky Way. All objects up to a certain magnitude must be measured in order to have unbiased samples.
- To permit a better understanding of the more rapid stages of stellar evolution (such as the classification, frequency, correlations and directly observed attributes of rare fundamental changes and of cyclical changes). This has to be achieved by detailed examination and re-examination of a great number of objects over a long period of operation. Observing a large number of objects in the galaxy is also important to understand its dynamics.
- Measuring the astrometric and kinematic properties of a star is necessary in order to understand the various stellar populations, especially the most distant.

== Spacecraft ==
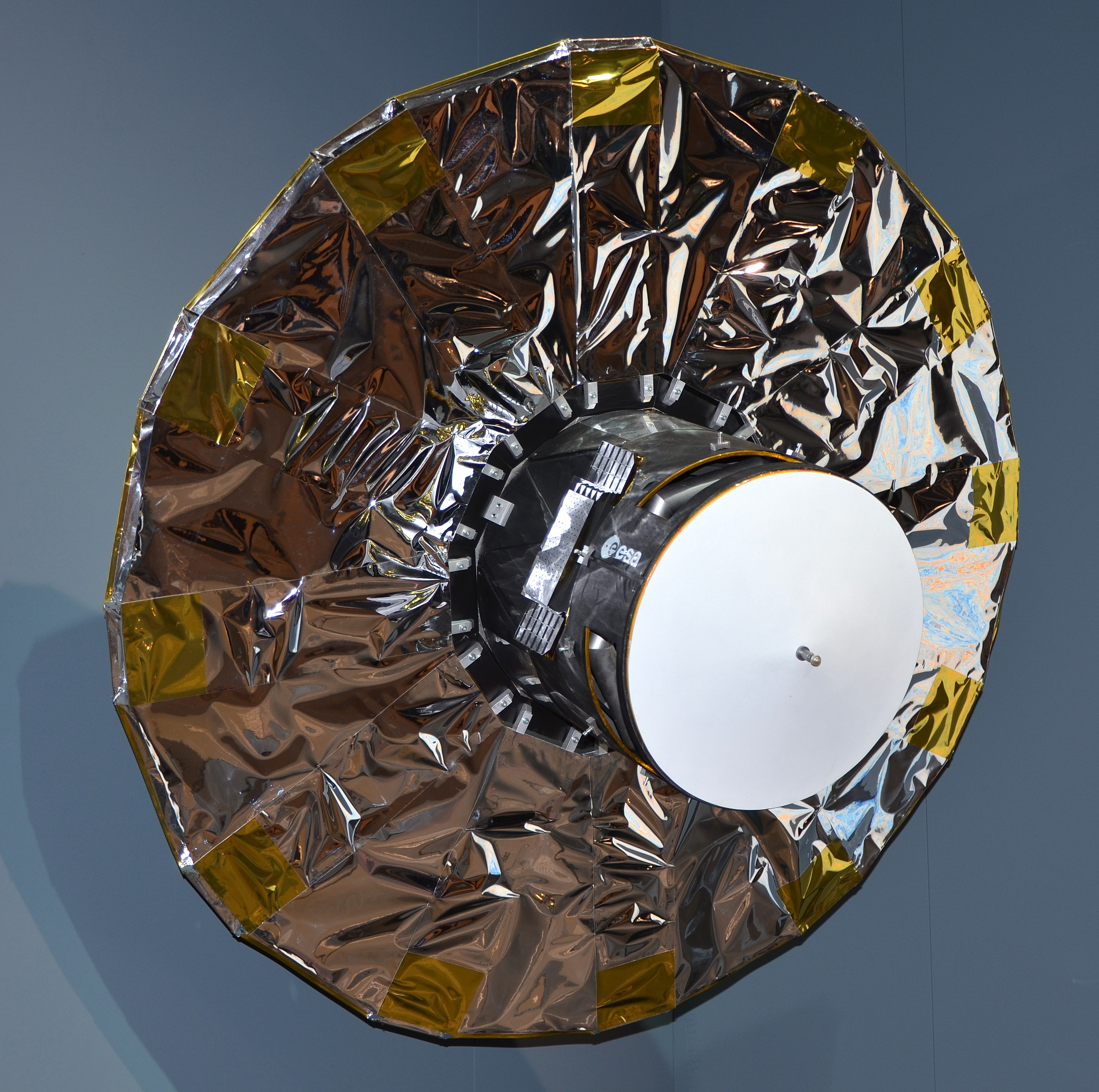
Model of Gaia at Paris Air Show 2013

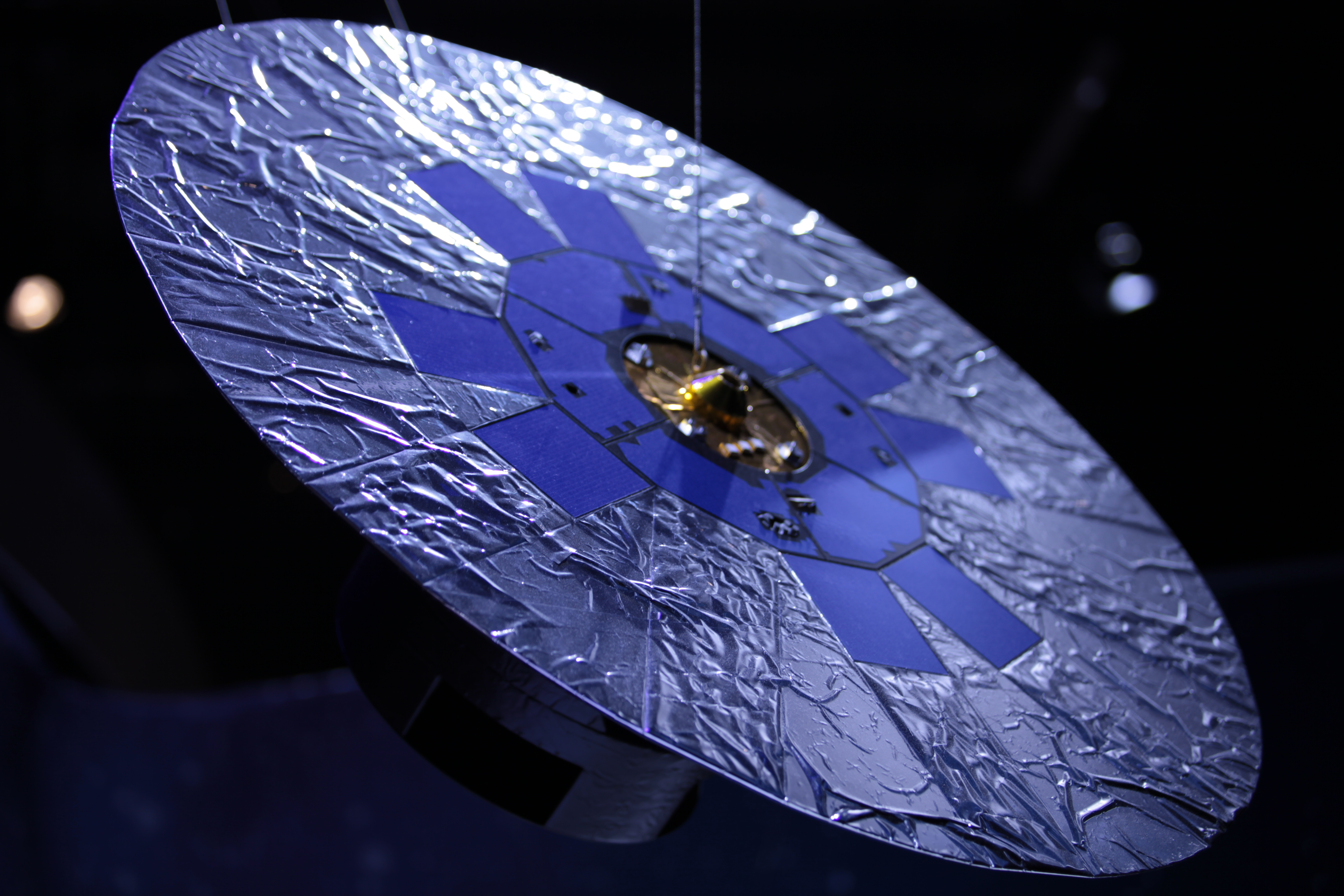
Gaia from different angle

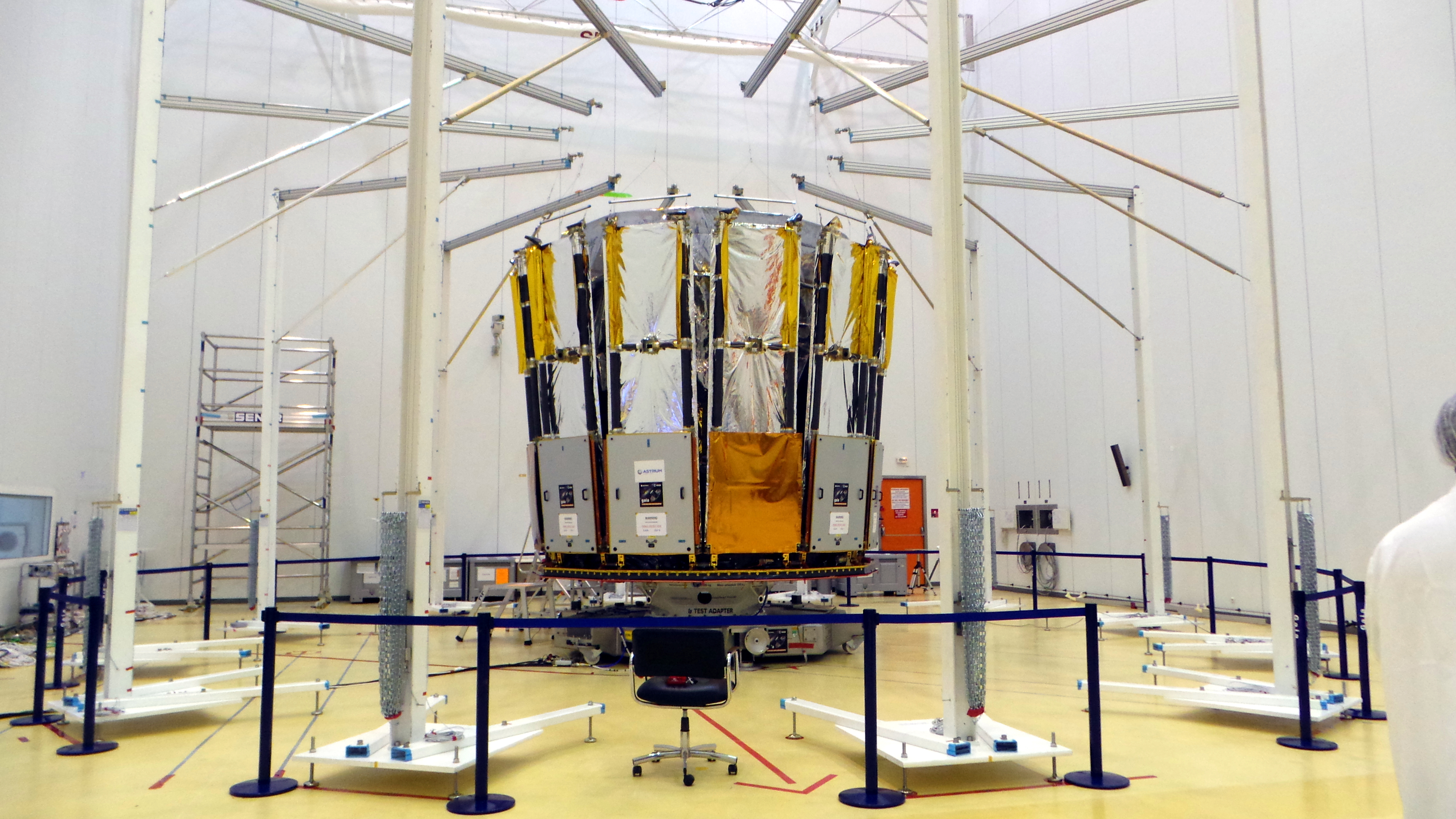
Gaia at its final phase of construction, 2013

Gaia was launched by Arianespace, using a Soyuz ST-B rocket with a Fregat-MT upper stage, from the Ensemble de Lancement Soyouz at Kourou in French Guiana on 19 December 2013 at 09:12 UTC (06:12 local time). The satellite separated from the rocket's upper stage 43 minutes after launch at 09:54 UTC.

The craft headed towards the Sun–Earth Lagrange point L2 located approximately 1.5 million kilometres from Earth, arriving there 8 January 2014. The L2 point provided the spacecraft with a very stable gravitational and thermal environment. There, it used a Lissajous orbit that avoided blockage of the Sun by the Earth, which would have limited the amount of solar energy the satellite could produce through its solar panels, as well as disturbing the spacecraft's thermal equilibrium. After launch, a 10-metre-diameter sunshade was deployed. The sunshade always maintained a fixed 45 degree angle to the Sun, while precessing to scan the sky, thus keeping all telescope components cool and powering Gaia using solar panels on its surface. These factors and the materials used in its creation allowed Gaia to function in conditions between −170°C and 70°C.

=== Scientific instruments ===
The Gaia payload consists of three main instruments:

1. The astrometry instrument (Astro) precisely determines the positions of all stars brighter than magnitude 20 by measuring their angular position. By combining the measurements of any given star over the duration of the mission, it will be possible to determine its parallax, and therefore its distance, and its proper motion—the velocity of the star projected on the plane of the sky.
2. The photometric instrument (BP/RP) allows the acquisition of luminosity measurements of stars over the 320–1000 nm spectral band, of all stars brighter than magnitude 20. The blue and red photometers (BP/RP) are used to determine stellar properties such as temperature, mass, age and elemental composition. Multi-colour photometry is provided by two low-resolution fused-silica prisms dispersing all the light entering the field of view in the along-scan direction prior to detection. The Blue Photometer (BP) operates in the wavelength range 330–680 nm; the Red Photometer (RP) covers the wavelength range 640–1050 nm.
3. The Radial-Velocity Spectrometer (RVS) is used to determine the velocity of celestial objects along the line of sight by acquiring high-resolution spectra in the spectral band 847–874 nm (field lines of calcium ion) for objects up to magnitude 17. Radial velocities are measured with a precision between 1 km/s (V=11.5) and 30 km/s (V=17.5). The measurements of radial velocities are important "to correct for perspective acceleration which is induced by the motion along the line of sight". The RVS reveals the velocity of the star along the line of sight of Gaia by measuring the Doppler shift of absorption lines in a high-resolution spectrum.

In order to maintain the fine pointing to focus on stars many light years away, the only moving parts were actuators to align the mirrors and the valves to fire the thrusters. It had no reaction wheels or gyroscopes. The spacecraft subsystems were mounted on a rigid silicon carbide frame, which provided a stable structure that would not expand or contract due to temperature. Attitude control was provided by small cold gas thrusters that could output 1.5 micrograms of nitrogen per second.

The bandwidth of the telemetric link with the satellite was about 3 Mbit/s on average, while the total content of the focal plane represented several Gbit/s. Therefore, only a few dozen pixels around each object could be downlinked.

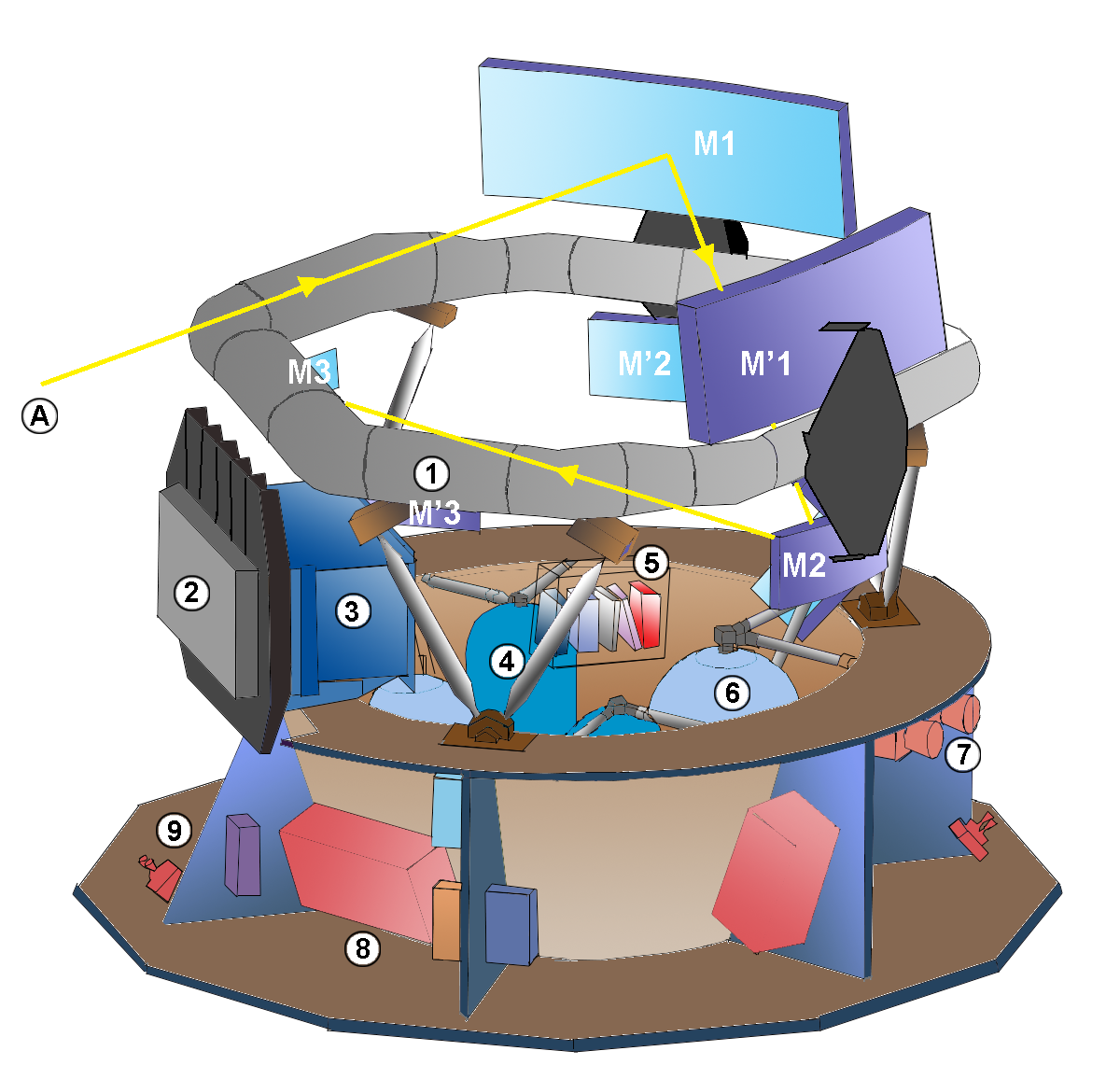
Diagram of Gaia

Mirrors (M)

- Mirrors of telescope 1 (M1, M2 and M3)
- Mirrors of telescope 2 (M'1, M'2 and M'3)
- mirrors M4, M'4, M5, M6 are not shown

Other components (1–9)

1. Optical bench (silicon carbide torus)
2. Focal plane cooling radiator
3. Focal plane electronics
4. Nitrogen tanks
5. Diffraction grating spectroscope
6. Liquid propellant tanks
7. Star trackers
8. Telecommunication panel and batteries
9. Main propulsion subsystem

(A) Light path of telescope 1

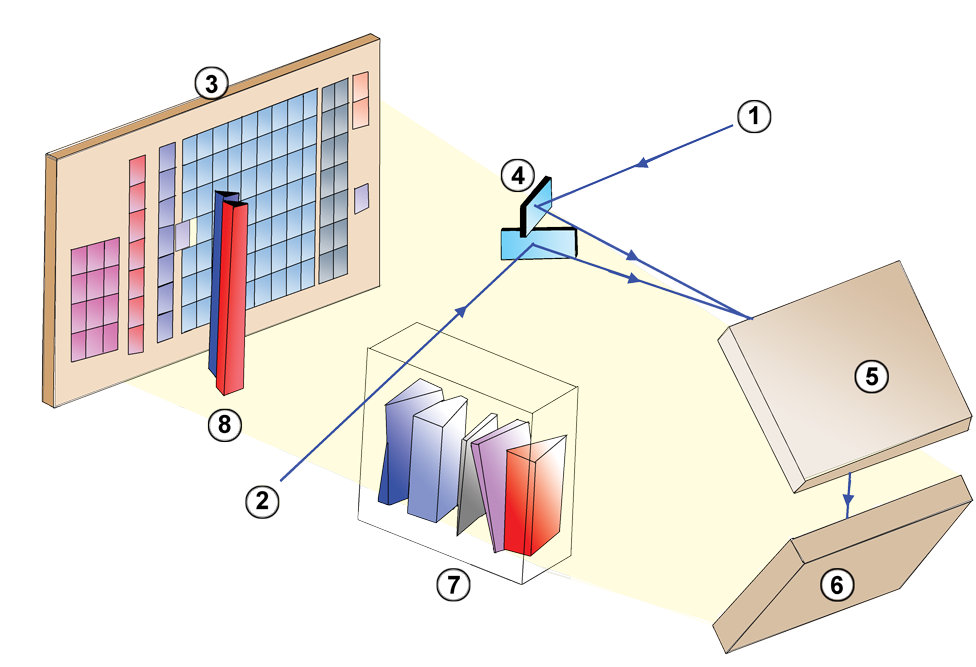
Design of the focal plane and instruments

The design of the Gaia focal plane and instruments. Due to the spacecraft's rotation, images crossed the focal plane array right-to-left at 60 arcseconds per second.

1. Incoming light from mirror M3
2. Incoming light from mirror M'3
3. Focal plane, containing the detector for the Astrometric instrument in light blue, Blue Photometer in dark blue, Red Photometer in red, and Radial Velocity Spectrometer in pink
4. Mirrors M4 and M'4, which combine the two incoming beams of light
5. Mirror M5
6. Mirror M6, which illuminates the focal plane
7. Optics and diffraction grating for the Radial Velocity Spectrometer (RVS)
8. Prisms for the Blue Photometer and Red Photometer (BP and RP)

=== Measurement principles ===
Comparison of nominal sizes of apertures of the Gaia (spacecraft) and some notable optical telescopes

Scanning method

Similar to its predecessor Hipparcos, but with a precision one hundred times greater, Gaia consisted of two telescopes providing two observing directions with a fixed, wide angle of 106.5° between them. The spacecraft rotated continuously around an axis perpendicular to the two telescopes' lines of sight, with a spin period of 6 hours. Thus, every 6 hours the spacecraft scanned a great circle strip approximately 0.7 degrees wide. The spin axis in turn had a slower precession across the sky: it maintained a fixed 45 degree angle to the Sun, but followed a cone around the Sun every 63 days, giving a cycloid-like path relative to the stars. Over the course of the mission, each observed star was scanned many times from various scan directions, providing interlocking measurements over the full sky.

The two key telescope properties were:

- 1.45 × 0.5 m primary mirror for each telescope
- 1.0 × 0.5 m focal plane array on which light from both telescopes was projected. This in turn consisted of 106 CCDs of 4500 × 1966 pixels each, for a total of 937.8 megapixels (commonly depicted as a gigapixel-class imaging device).

Each observed celestial object was observed on average about 70 times during the five years of the nominal mission, which was later extended to approximately ten years and thus twice as many observations were obtained. These measurements will help determine the astrometric parameters of stars: two corresponding to the angular position of a given star on the sky, two for the derivatives of the star's position over time (motion) and lastly, the star's parallax from which distance can be calculated. The radial velocity of the brighter stars was measured by an integrated spectrometer observing the Doppler effect. Because of the physical constraints imposed by the Soyuz spacecraft, Gaia's focal arrays could not be equipped with optimal radiation shielding, and ESA expected their performance to suffer somewhat toward the end of the initial five-year mission. Ground tests of the CCDs while they were subjected to radiation provided reassurance that the primary mission's objectives could be met.

An atomic clock on board Gaia played a crucial role in achieving the mission's primary objectives. Gaia rotated with angular velocity of 60"/sec or 0.6 microarcseconds in 10 nanoseconds. Therefore, in order to meet its positioning goals, Gaia had to be able to record the exact time of observation to within nanoseconds. Furthermore, no systematic positioning errors over the rotational period of 6 hours should be introduced by the clock performance. For the timing error to be below 10 nanoseconds over each rotational period, the frequency stability of the on-board clock needed to be better than 10^{−12}. The rubidium atomic clock aboard the Gaia spacecraft had a stability reaching ~ 10^{−13} over each rotational period of 21600 seconds.

Gaia's measurements contribute to the creation and maintenance of a high-precision celestial reference frame, the Barycentric Celestial Reference System (BCRS), which is essential for both astronomy and navigation. This reference frame serves as a fundamental grid for positioning celestial objects in the sky, aiding astronomers in various research endeavors. All observations, regardless of the actual positioning of the spacecraft, must be expressed in terms of this reference system. As a fully relativistic model, the influence of the gravitational field of the solar-system must be taken into account, including such factors as the gravitational light-bending due to the Sun, the major planets and the Moon.

The expected accuracies of the final catalogue data have been calculated following in-orbit testing, taking into account the issues of stray light, degradation of the optics, and the basic angle instability. The best accuracies for parallax, position and proper motion are obtained for the brighter observed stars, apparent magnitudes 3–12. The standard deviation for these stars is expected to be 6.7 micro-arcseconds or better. For fainter stars, error levels increase, reaching 26.6 micro-arcseconds error in the parallax for 15th-magnitude stars, and several hundred micro-arcseconds for 20th-magnitude stars. For comparison, the best parallax error levels from an analysis in 2007 of the Hipparcos data (which observed objects of magnitude 11 or brighter) are no better than 100 micro-arcseconds, with typical levels several times larger.

== Launch and orbit ==
Animation of Gaia's trajectory

Polar view

Equatorial view

Viewed from the Sun

Gaia · Earth

Simplified illustration of Gaia's trajectory and orbit (not to scale)

In October 2013 ESA had to postpone Gaia's original launch date, due to a precautionary replacement of two of Gaia's transponders. These are used to generate timing signals for the downlink of science data. A problem with an identical transponder on a satellite already in orbit motivated their replacement and reverification once incorporated into Gaia. The rescheduled launch window was from 17 December 2013 to 5 January 2014, with Gaia slated for launch on 19 December.

Gaia was successfully launched on 19 December 2013 at 09:12 UTC. About three weeks after launch, on 8 January 2014, it reached its designated orbit around the Sun-Earth L2 Lagrange point (SEL2), about 1.5 million kilometres from Earth.

In 2015, the Pan-STARRS observatory discovered an object orbiting the Earth, which the Minor Planet Center catalogued as object 2015 HP_{116}. It was soon found to be an accidental rediscovery of the Gaia spacecraft and the designation was promptly retracted.

== Issues ==
=== Stray light problem ===
Shortly after launch, ESA revealed that Gaia suffered from a stray light problem. The problem was initially thought to be due to ice deposits reflecting some of the light diffracted around the edges of the sunshield into the telescope apertures and on towards the focal plane. The actual source of the stray light was later identified as the fibers of the sunshield, protruding beyond the edges of the shield. This resulted in a "degradation in science performance [which] will be relatively modest and mostly restricted to the faintest of Gaia's one billion stars." Mitigation schemes were implemented to improve performance. The degradation is more severe for the RVS spectrograph than for the astrometry measurements, because the spectrograph spreads the light of each observed star onto a much larger number of detector pixels, each of which is affected by approximately the same amount of extraneous stray light as a pixel of the astrometric instrument.

This kind of problem has some historical background. In 1985 on STS-51-F, the Space Shuttle Spacelab-2 mission, another astronomical mission hampered by stray debris was the Infrared Telescope (IRT), in which a piece of mylar insulation broke loose and floated into the line-of-sight of the telescope causing corrupted data. The testing of stray-light and baffles is a noted part of space imaging instruments.

=== Micrometeoroid hit ===
In April 2024, a micrometeoroid hit and damaged Gaia's protective cover, creating "a little gap that allowed stray sunlight – around one billionth of the intensity of direct sunlight felt on Earth – to occasionally disrupt Gaia's very sensitive sensors". In May, the electronics of one of the CCDs failed, which caused a high rate of false detections. After that, the engineers refocused Gaia's optics "for the final time".

== Mission progress ==
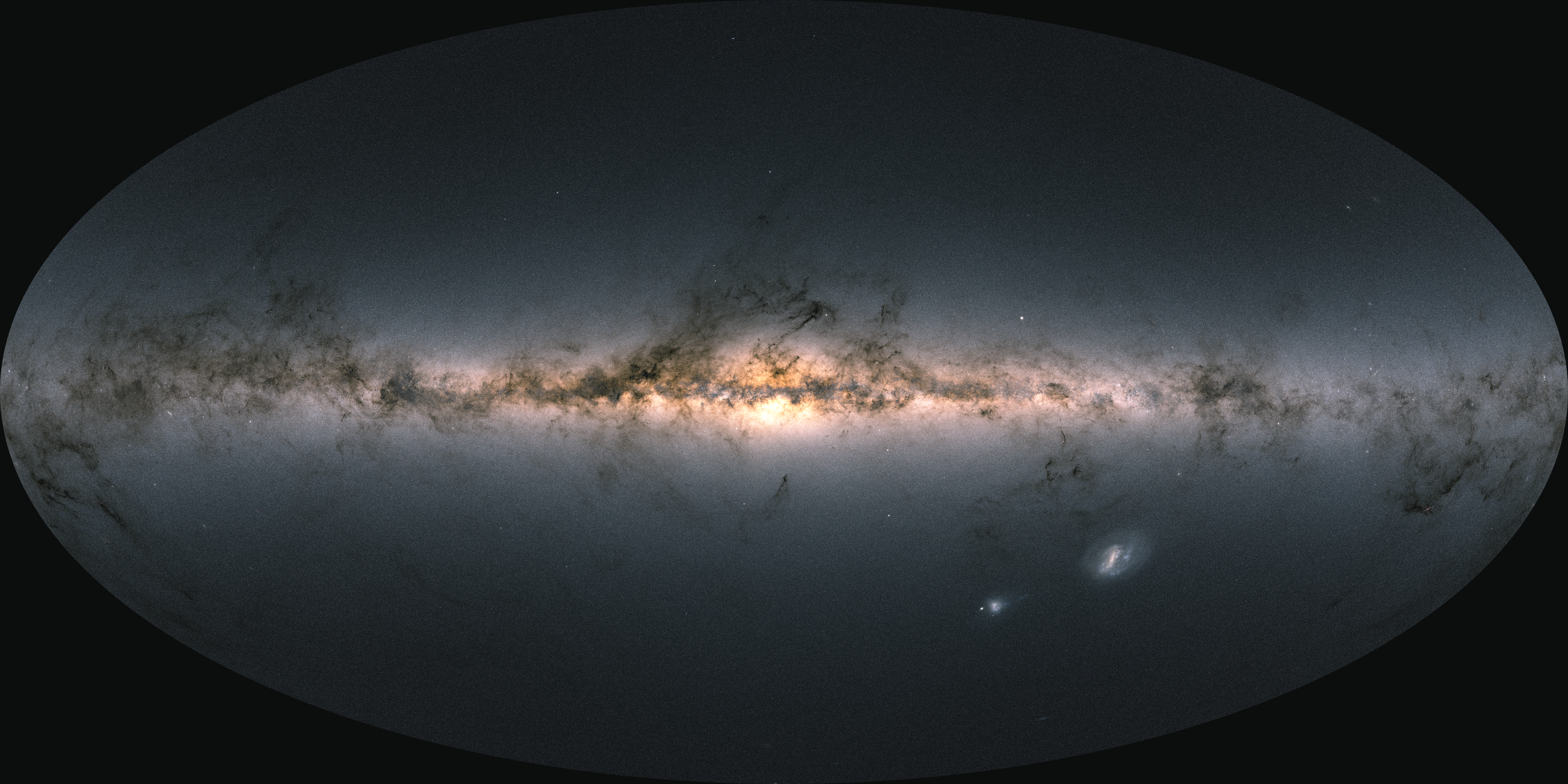
Gaia map of the sky by star density

The testing and calibration phase, which started while Gaia was en route to SEL2 point, continued until the end of July 2014, three months behind schedule due to unforeseen issues with stray light entering the detector. After the six-month commissioning period, the satellite started its nominal five-year period of scientific operations on 25 July 2014 using a special scanning mode that intensively scanned the region near the ecliptic poles; on 21 August 2014 Gaia began using its normal scanning mode which provides more uniform coverage.

Although it was originally planned to limit Gaia's observations to stars fainter than magnitude 5.7, tests carried out during the commissioning phase indicated that Gaia could autonomously identify stars as bright as magnitude 3. When Gaia entered regular scientific operations in July 2014, it was configured to routinely process stars in the magnitude range 3–20. On the more luminous side of that limit, special operational procedures downloaded raw scanning data for the remaining 230 stars brighter than magnitude 3; methods to reduce and analyse these data were developed; and it was expected that there will be "complete sky coverage at the bright end" with standard errors of "a few dozen'' microarcseconds.

On 30 August 2014, Gaia discovered its first supernova in another galaxy. On 3 July 2015, a map of the Milky Way by star density was released, based on data from the spacecraft. By August 2016, over 50 billion focal plane transits, 110 billion photometric observations and 9.4 billion spectroscopic observations were processed.

In 2018 the Gaia mission was extended to 2020, and in 2020 it was further extended until 2022, with an additional "indicative extension" extending to 2025. The limiting factor to further mission extensions was the supply of nitrogen for the cold gas thrusters of the micro-propulsion system. The amount of dinitrogen tetroxide and monomethylhydrazine for the chemical propulsion subsystem on board might have been enough to stabilize the spacecraft at L2 for several decades. Without the cold gas, though, the space craft could no longer be pointed on a microarcsecond scale.

In March 2023, the Gaia mission was extended through the second quarter of 2025, when the spacecraft was expected to run out of cold gas propellant.

=== End of mission ===
Gaia's last targeted observation was done on 10 January 2025. After several weeks of onboard technology tests, Gaia left its orbit near L_{2} and was put into a heliocentric orbit away from Earth's sphere of influence. After downlinking all remaining data to Earth, Gaia was decommissioned and passivated on 27 March 2025. The mission has since entered a post-operations phase to complete and publish the remaining data.

== Data releases ==
Several Gaia catalogues are released over the years each time with increasing amounts of information and better astrometry; the early releases also miss some stars, especially fainter stars located in dense star fields and members of close binary pairs. The first data release, Gaia DR1, based on 14 months of observation was on 14 September 2016. The data release includes "positions and ... magnitudes for 1.1 billion stars using only Gaia data; positions, parallaxes and proper motions for more than 2 million stars" based on a combination of Gaia and Tycho-2 data for those objects in both catalogues; "light curves and characteristics for about 3,000 variable stars; and positions and magnitudes for more than 2000 ... extragalactic sources used to define the celestial reference frame".

The second data release (DR2), which occurred on 25 April 2018, is based on 22 months of observations made between 25 July 2014 and 23 May 2016. It includes positions, parallaxes and proper motions for about 1.3 billion stars and positions of an additional 300 million stars in the magnitude range g = 3–20, red and blue photometric data for about 1.1 billion stars and single colour photometry for an additional 400 million stars, and median radial velocities for about 7 million stars between magnitude 4 and 13. It also contains data for over 14,000 selected Solar System objects.

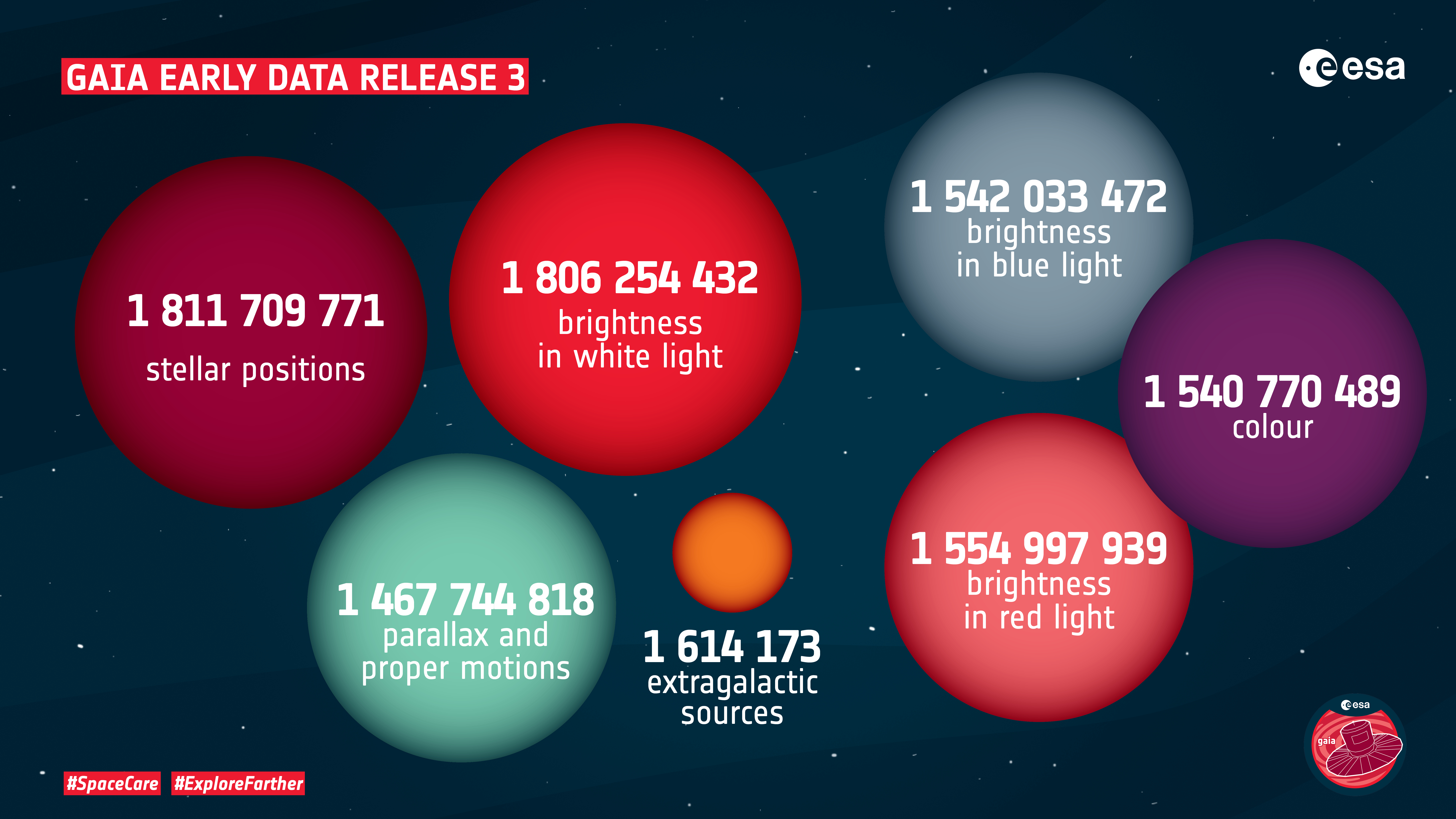
Stars and other objects in Gaia Early Data Release 3

Due to uncertainties in the data pipeline, the third data release, based on 34 months of observations, was split into two parts so that data that was ready first, was released first. The first part, EDR3 ("Early Data Release 3"), consisting of improved positions, parallaxes and proper motions, was released on 3 December 2020. The coordinates in EDR3 use a new version of the Gaia celestial reference frame (Gaia–CRF3), based on observations of 1,614,173 extragalactic sources, 2,269 of which were common to radio sources in the third revision of the International Celestial Reference Frame (ICRF3). Included is the Gaia Catalogue of Nearby Stars (GCNS), containing 331,312 stars within (nominally) 100 parsecs (330 light-years).

The full DR3, published on 13 June 2022, includes the EDR3 data plus Solar System data; variability information; results for non-single stars, for quasars, and for extended objects; astrophysical parameters; and a special data set, the Gaia Andromeda Photometric Survey (GAPS).

Between DR3 and DR4 there was a Focused Product Release, publishing among other things new data on the Omega Centauri cluster using a novel observation technique; the technique will be extended to all globular clusters and other dense fields in future full Data Releases.

=== Future releases ===
The full data release for the five-year nominal mission, DR4, will include full astrometric, photometric and radial-velocity catalogues, variable-star and non-single-star solutions, source classifications plus multiple astrophysical parameters for stars, unresolved binaries, galaxies and quasars, an exoplanet list and epoch and transit data for all sources. Additional release(s) will take place depending on mission extensions. Most measurements in DR4 are expected to be 1.7 times more precise than DR2; proper motions will be 4.5 times more precise. DR4 is expected to be released no earlier than December 2026.

The final Gaia catalogue, DR5, will consist of all data collected during the lifespan of the mission. It will be 1.4 times more precise than DR4, while proper motions will be 2.8 times more precise than DR4. It will be published no earlier than the end of 2030. All data of all catalogues will be available in an online data base that is free to use.

An outreach application, Gaia Sky, has been developed to explore the galaxy in three dimensions using Gaia data.

=== Data processing ===
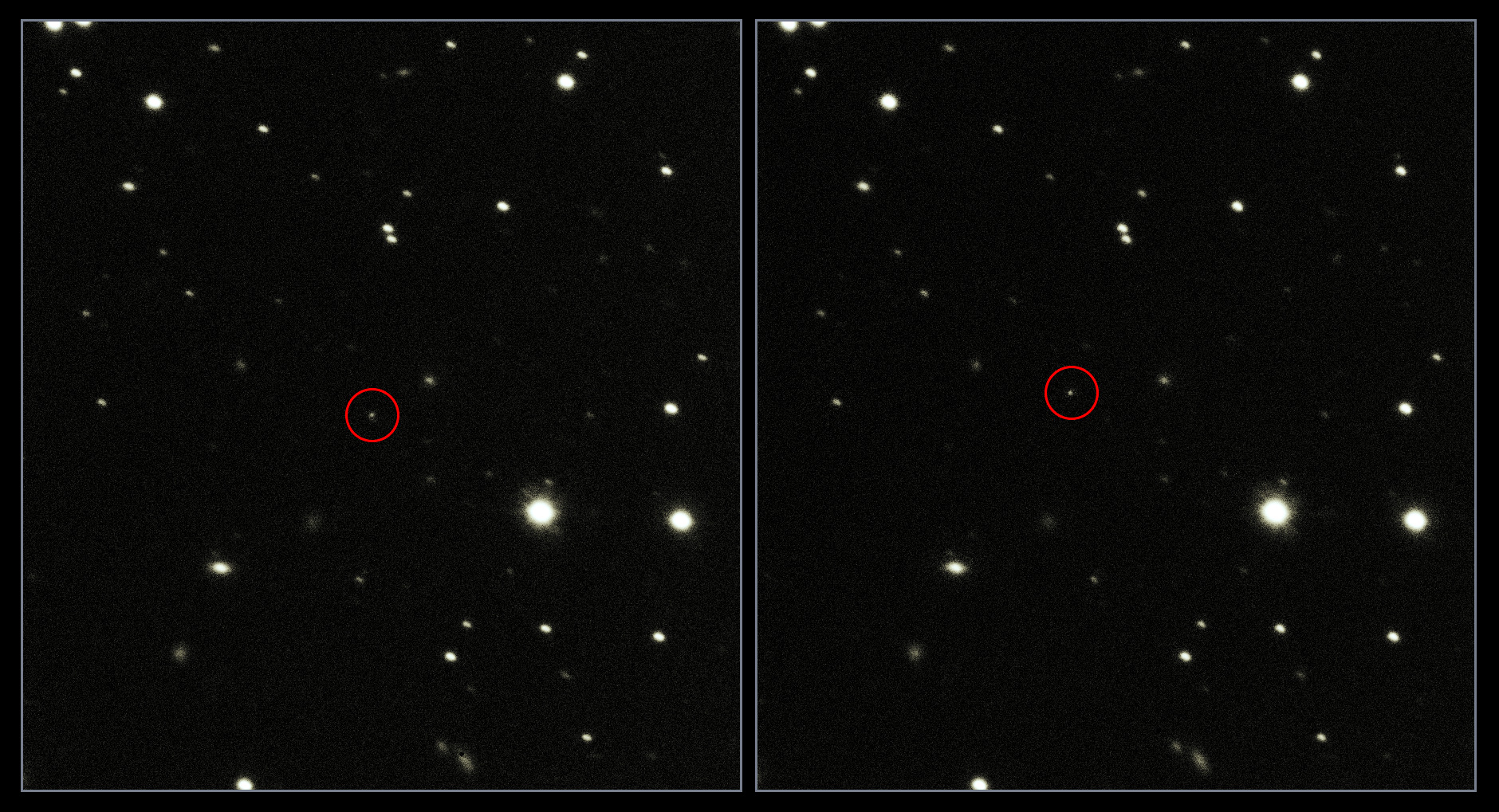
VST snaps Gaia en route to a billion stars

The overall data volume that was retrieved from the spacecraft during the nominal five-year mission at a compressed data rate of 1.0 Mbit/s is approximately 60 TB, amounting to about 200 TB of usable uncompressed data on the ground, stored in an InterSystems Caché database. The responsibility of the data processing, partly funded by ESA, is entrusted to a European consortium, the Data Processing and Analysis Consortium (DPAC), which was selected after its proposal to the ESA Announcement of Opportunity released in November 2006. DPAC's funding is provided by the participating countries and has been secured until the production of Gaia's final catalogue.

Gaia sent back data for about eight hours every day at about 5 Mbit/s. ESA's three 35-metre-diameter radio dishes of the ESTRACK network in Cebreros, Spain, Malargüe, Argentina and New Norcia, Australia, received the data.

== Significant results ==
In July 2017, the Gaia–ESO Survey reported using Gaia data to find double-, triple-, and quadruple- stars. Using advanced techniques they identified 342 binary candidates, 11 triple candidates, and 1 quadruple candidate. Nine of these had been identified by other means, thus confirming that the technique can correctly identify multiple star systems. The possible quadruple star system is HD 74438, which was, in a paper published in 2022, identified as a possible progenitor of a sub-Chandrasekhar Type Ia supernovae.

In November 2017, scientists led by Davide Massari of the Kapteyn Astronomical Institute, University of Groningen, Netherlands released a paper describing the characterization of proper motion (3D) within the Sculptor Dwarf Galaxy, and of that galaxy's trajectory through space and with respect to the Milky Way, using data from Gaia and the Hubble Space Telescope. Massari said, "With the precision achieved we can measure the yearly motion of a star on the sky which corresponds to less than the size of a pinhead on the Moon as seen from Earth." The data showed that Sculptor orbits the Milky Way in a highly elliptical orbit; it is currently near its closest approach at a distance of about 83.4 kiloparsecs (272,000 ly), but the orbit can take it out to around 222 kiloparsecs (720,000 ly) distant.

In October 2018, Leiden University astronomers were able to determine the orbits of 20 hyperrunaway star candidates from the DR2 dataset. Expecting to find a single star exiting the Milky Way, they instead found seven. More surprisingly, the team found that 13 hyperrunaway stars were instead approaching the Milky Way, possibly originating from as-of-yet unknown extragalactic sources. Alternatively, they could be halo stars to this galaxy, and further spectroscopic studies will help determine which scenario is more likely. Independent measurements have demonstrated that the greatest Gaia radial velocity among the hyperrunaway stars is contaminated by light from nearby bright stars in a crowded field and cast doubt on the high Gaia radial velocities of other hypervelocity stars.

In late October 2018, the galactic population Gaia-Enceladus, the remains of a major merger with the defunct Enceladus dwarf, was discovered. This system is associated with at least 13 globular clusters, and the creation of the Thick Disk of the Milky Way. It represents a significant merger about 10 billion years ago in the Milky Way Galaxy.

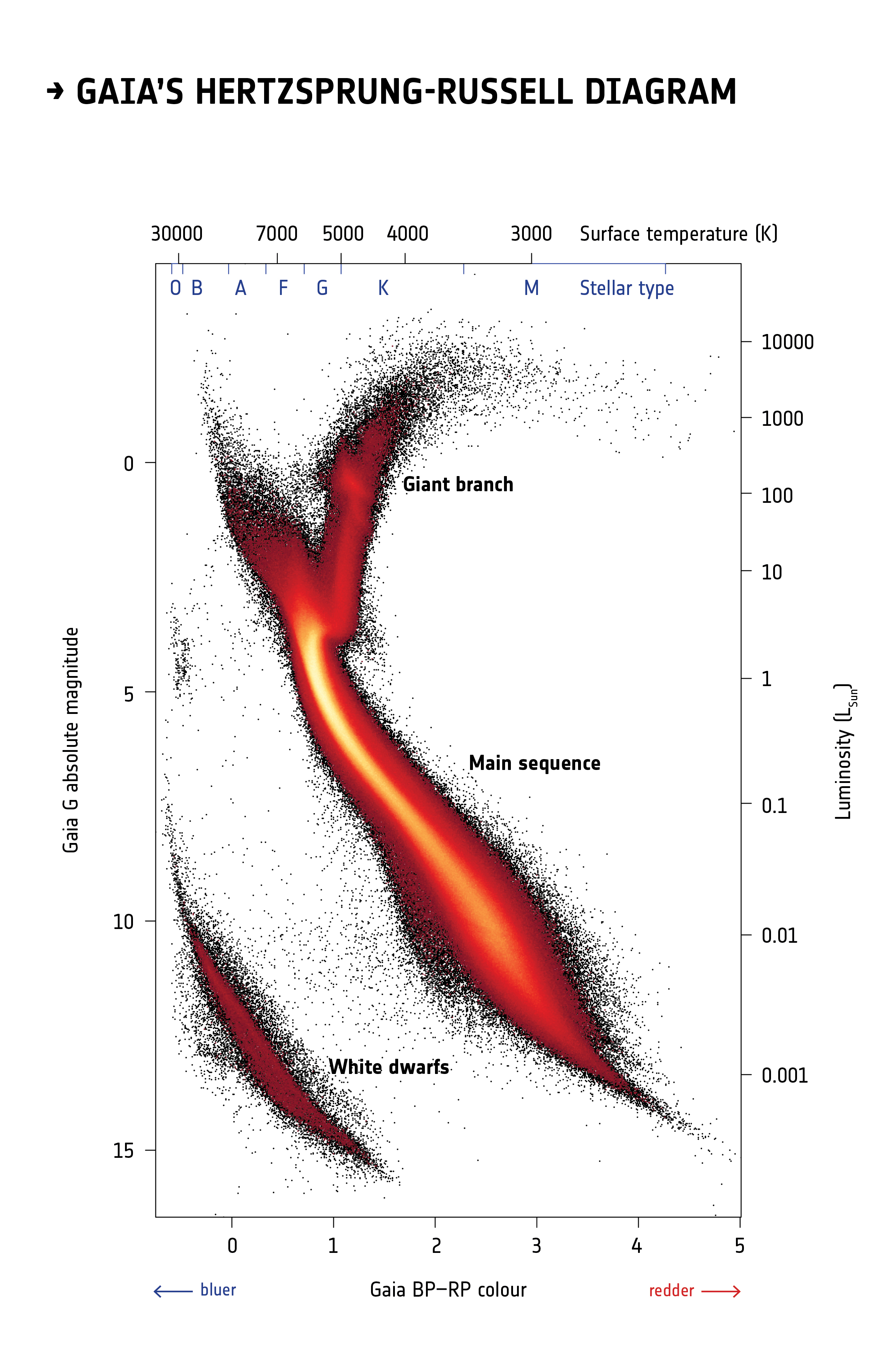
Gaia's HR Diagram

In November 2018, the galaxy Antlia 2 was discovered. It is similar in size to the Large Magellanic Cloud, despite being 10,000 times fainter. Antlia 2 has the lowest surface brightness of any galaxy discovered.

In December 2019 the star cluster Price-Whelan 1 was discovered. The cluster belongs to the Magellanic Clouds and is located in the leading arm of these Dwarf Galaxies. The discovery suggests that the stream of gas extending from the Magellanic Clouds to the Milky Way is about half as far from the Milky Way as previously thought.

The Radcliffe wave was discovered in data measured by Gaia, published in January 2020.

In November 2020, Gaia measured the acceleration of the Solar System towards the Galactic Center as 0.23 nanometres per second^{2}.

In March 2021, the European Space Agency announced that Gaia had identified a transiting exoplanet for the first time. The planet was discovered orbiting solar-type star Gaia EDR3 3026325426682637824. Following its initial discovery, the PEPSI spectrograph from the Large Binocular Telescope (LBT) in Arizona was used to confirm the discovery and categorise it as a Jovian planet, a gas planet composed of hydrogen and helium gas. In May 2022, the confirmation of this exoplanet, designated Gaia-1b, was formally published, along with a second planet, Gaia-2b.

12 Einstein crosses were discovered by Gaia on April 2021.

Based on its data, Gaia's Hertzsprung–Russell diagram (HR diagram) is one of the most accurate ones ever produced of the Milky Way Galaxy.

Analysis of Gaia DR3 data in 2022 revealed a Sun-like star with the identifier Gaia DR3 4373465352415301632 orbiting a black hole, dubbed Gaia BH1. At a distance of roughly 1,600 light-years (490 pc), it is the closest known black hole to Earth. Another system with a red giant orbiting a black hole, Gaia BH2, was also discovered.

In September 2023, radial velocity observations were used to confirm an exoplanet orbiting the star HIP 66074 that was first detected in Gaia DR3 astrometry data. This planet, known as HIP 66074 b or Gaia-3b, is the third Gaia exoplanet discovery to be confirmed and the first such discovery made using astrometry. In addition, another exoplanet was discovered from a gravitational microlensing event observed by Gaia, Gaia22dkv. The host star is brighter than that of any exoplanet previously detected by microlensing, potentially making the planet detectable by radial velocity as well.

In March 2024, Gaia discovered two streams of stars, named by researchers as Shakti and Shiva, that formed more than 12 billion years ago.

In 2025, a detailed 3D map of dust distribution within the Milky Way was constructed using data from Gaia and LAMOST spectral survey and machine learning.

== GaiaNIR ==
GaiaNIR (Gaia Near Infra-Red) is a proposed successor of Gaia in the near-infrared. The mission would enlarge the current catalogue with sources that are only (or better) visible in the near-infrared, at the cost of less precise measurements than an equivalent visible-light mission due to the broader diffraction pattern at longer wavelengths. It would at the same time improve the star parallax and particularly proper motion accuracy by revisiting the sources of the Gaia catalogue. One of the main challenges in building GaiaNIR is the low technology readiness level of near-infrared time delay and integration detectors but recent progress with Avalanche photodiode detectors (APDs) is overcoming this. In a 2017 ESA report two alternative concepts using conventional near-infrared detectors and de-spin mirrors were proposed but even without the development of NIR TDI detectors the technological challenge will likely increase the cost over an ESA M-class mission and might need shared cost with other space agencies. One possible partnership with US institutions was proposed. Since then the European Space Agency Science Programme Voyage 2050 has selected the theme of "Galactic Ecosystem with Astrometry in the Near-infrared" as one of two potential L-class missions to be implemented in the coming years thus boosting the chances for GaiaNIR which proposes exactly this.

== Gallery ==
Four maps of the Milky Way galaxy: radial velocity (top left), proper motion (bottom left); interstellar dust (top right); and metallicity (bottom right).

A visualisation of Gaia scanning the sky in great circles lasting about 6 hours from July 2014 to September 2015.

Illustration of Oort's formulae describing the curve obtained from plotting angular velocities against the galactic longitude

Microlensing events over the galactic map as observed by Gaia from 2014 to 2018 (Timer on bottom left corner)

The image covers about 0.6 square degrees, making it conceivable that there are some 2.8 million stars captured in this image sequence alone. The image appears in strips, each representing a sky mapper CCD. The image was taken on 7 February 2017.

== See also ==
- Gaia catalogues – Catalogues consisting of data from the Gaia mission
- Cosmic distance ladder – Succession of methods by which astronomers determine the distances to celestial objects
- Space Interferometry Mission – Cancelled NASA space telescope
