= Gaia Sky =

Open-source astronomy visualisation program

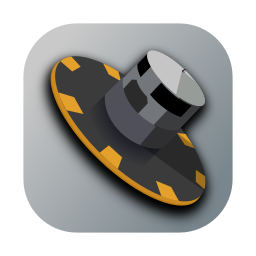

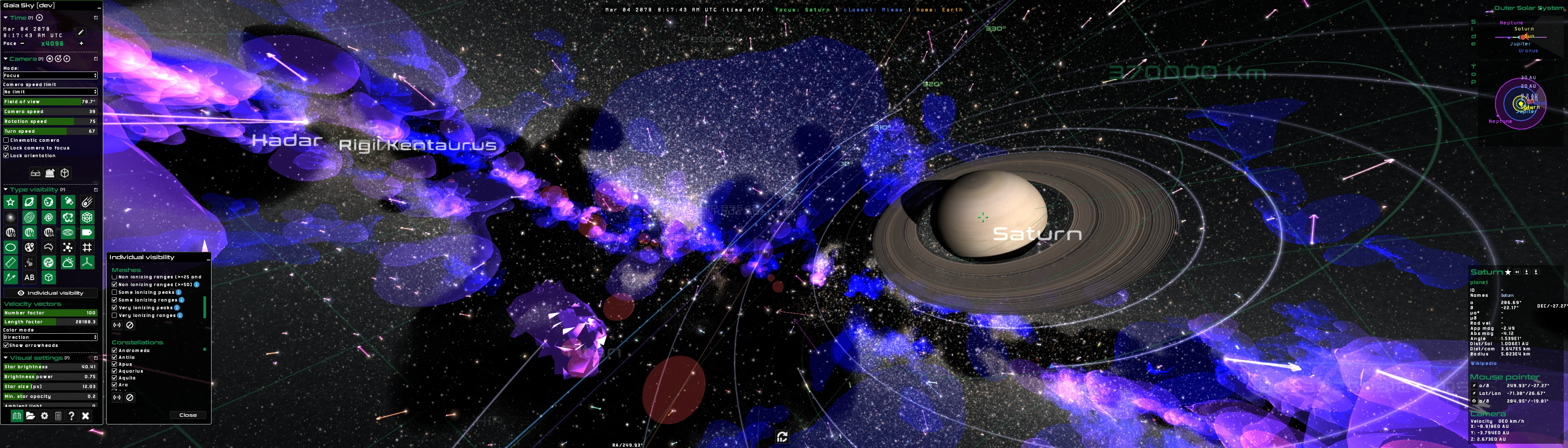
- Saturn with its moons in Gaia Sky
- Original author: Toni Sagristà Sellés
- Developer: Toni Sagristà Sellés
- Release: 2014; 12 years ago
- Stable release: 3.6.11 / 28 July 2025
- Written in: Java, GLSL
- Operating system: Linux, macOS and Microsoft Windows
- Size: Linux: 90 MB macOS: 95 MB; Windows: 88 MB tar.gz package: 41 MB; Source code: 9.77 MB
- Type: Educational software Space simulator
- License: Mozilla Public License
- Website: gaiasky.space
- Repository: codeberg.org/gaiasky/gaiasky

Gaia Sky is an open-source astronomy visualisation desktop and VR program with versions for Windows, Linux and macOS. It is created and developed by Toni Sagristà Sellés in the framework of ESA's Gaia mission to create a billion-star multi-dimensional map of the Milky Way Galaxy, in the Gaia group of the Astronomisches Rechen-Institut (ZAH, Universität Heidelberg). Gaia Sky is a product of the outreach working group of the Gaia Data Processing and Analysis Consortium. The software is released under the Mozilla Public License.

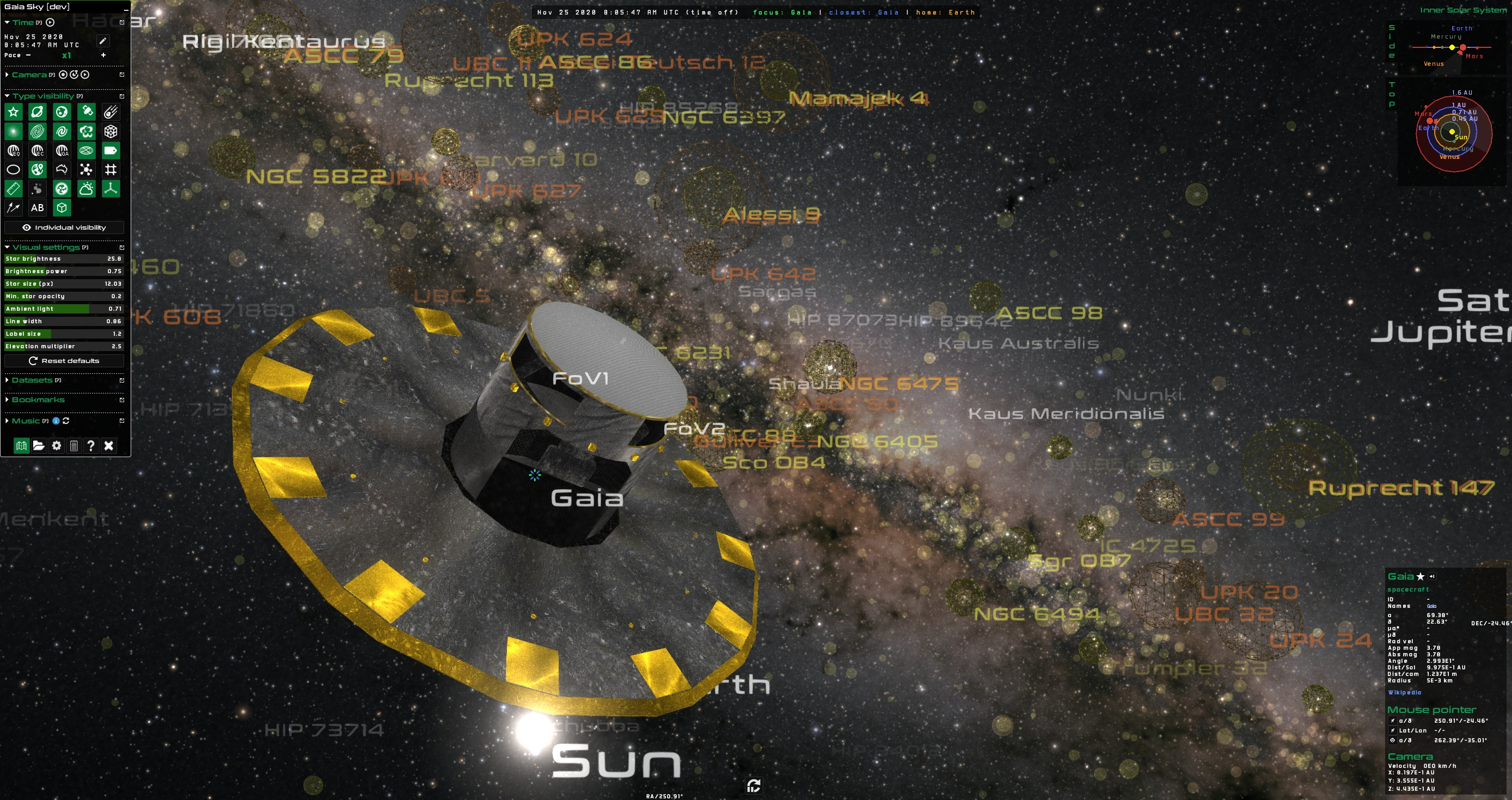
The Gaia satellite in Gaia Sky

The inner workings of Gaia Sky are described in detail in the paper Gaia Sky: Navigating the Gaia Catalog.

Gaia Sky offers many advanced features like the stereoscopic (3D), planetarium and panorama renderers. It also works with virtual reality headsets through OpenXR, is fully scriptable with Python and features game controller support that makes it possible to operate it even with a racing wheel.

Gaia Sky is used by ESA to aid in the video production of Gaia Data Releases. A video made with Gaia Sky was also featured in the Astronomy Picture of the Day website.

== Data ==
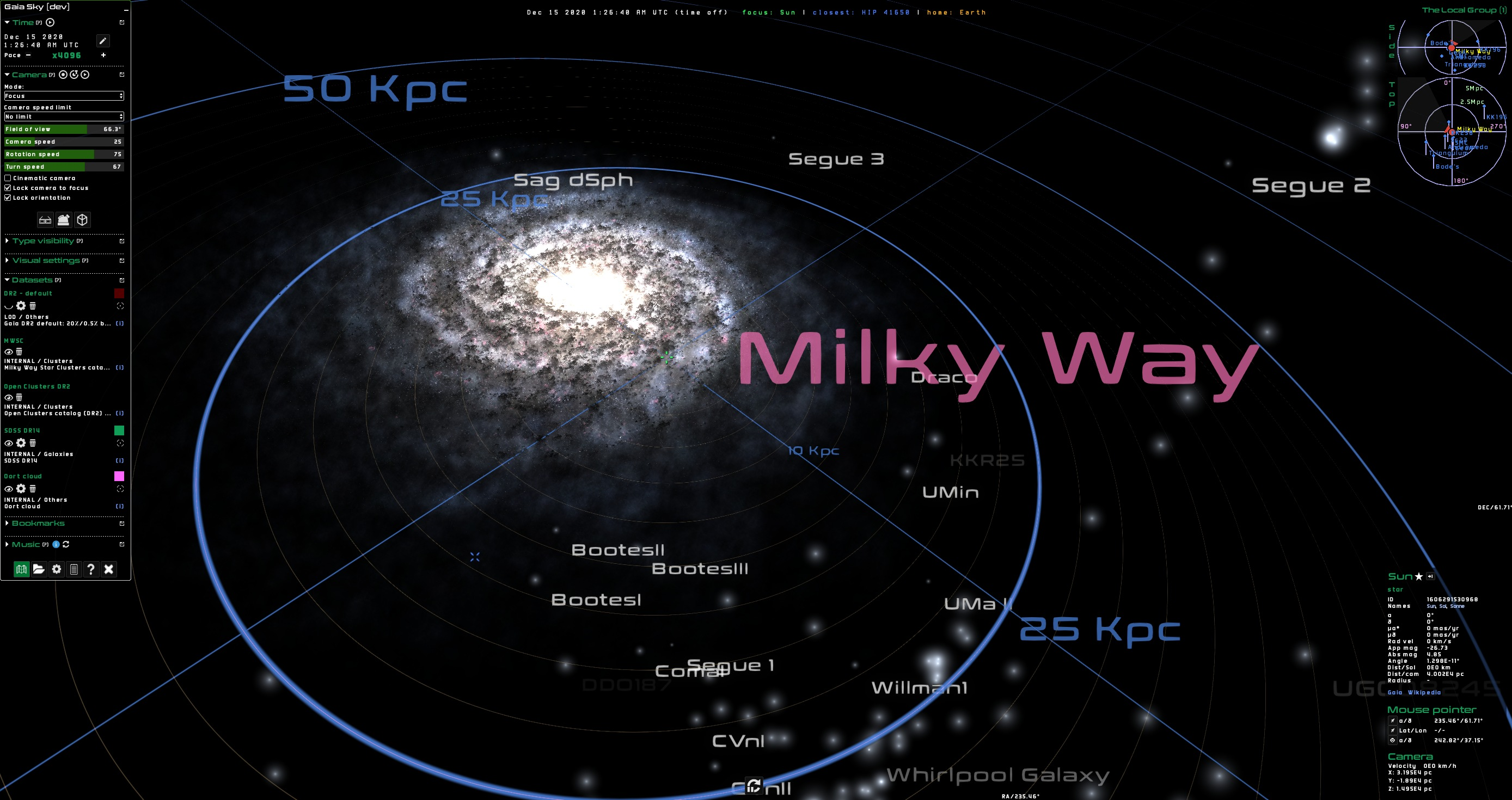
The Milky Way from afar

The installer packages of Gaia Sky contain the program but no data at all. In order to use Gaia Sky, at least a download of the base data package, containing the Solar System with low-resolution textures, is necessary. Gaia Sky offers a built-in download manager which connects to the servers at the Astronomisches Rechen-Institut in Heidelberg to fetch the desired datasets. The downloading and deploying processes are seamless to the user.

Several datasets are available, offering higher resolution textures, different cuts of the Gaia eDR3 catalog (up to 1.46 billion stars), other star catalogs such as the Hipparcos catalog, different galaxy maps (dust, HII regions, etc.), nebulae or extragalactic catalogs such as NBG or Sloan Digital Sky Survey.

All datasets are specified in JSON files following a comprehensible and well documented format.
