= Data Processing and Analysis Consortium =

Astronomy research consortium for the Gaia mission

The Gaia Data Processing and Analysis Consortium (DPAC) is a group of over 400 European scientists and software engineers formed with the objective to design, develop and execute the data processing system for ESA's ambitious Gaia space astrometry mission. It was formally formed in June 2006 by European scientists, with the initial goal of answering an Announcement of Opportunity to be issued by ESA before the end of that year. At a meeting in Paris on 24–25 May 2007, ESA's Science Programme Committee (SPC) approved the DPAC proposal submitted in response to the Announcement of Opportunity for the Gaia data processing. The proposal describes a complete data processing system capable of handling the full size and complexity of the Gaia data within the mission schedule. Following the SPC approval, the DPAC is officially responsible for all Gaia data processing activities.

On 1 January 2010, DPAC comprises 430 members coming from 24 European countries, with the largest contributions coming from France, Italy, United Kingdom, Germany, Belgium, Spain and Switzerland. The consortium is organized around a set of nine Coordination Units (CUs), eight being each in charge of a particular aspect of the processing, and the last one being in charge of the publication of the Catalogue.
