= Summer time in Europe =

Variation of standard clock time

Time in Europe: Light Blue / Western European Time / Greenwich Mean Time (UTC); Blue / Western European Time / Greenwich Mean Time (UTC); Blue / Western European Summer Time / British Summer Time / Irish Standard Time (UTC+1); Red / Central European Time (UTC+1); Red / Central European Summer Time (UTC+2); Yellow / Eastern European Time / Kaliningrad Time (UTC+2); Ochre / Eastern European Time (UTC+2); Ochre / Eastern European Summer Time (UTC+3); Green / Moscow Time / Turkey Time (UTC+3); Turquoise / Armenia Time / Azerbaijan Time / Georgia Time / Samara Time (UTC+4); ▉▉▉▉ Pale hues: Standard time observed all year ▉▉▉ Dark hues: Daylight saving time

Summer time in Europe is the variation of standard clock time that is applied in most European countries (apart from Iceland, Belarus, Turkey and Russia) in the period between spring and autumn, during which clocks are advanced by one hour from the time observed in the rest of the year, with a view to making the most efficient use of seasonal daylight. It corresponds to the notion and practice of daylight saving time (DST) to be found in some other parts of the world.

In all locations in Europe where summer time is observed (the EU, EFTA and associated countries), European Summer Time begins at 01:00 UTC/WET (02:00 CET, 03:00 EET) on the last Sunday in March (between 25 and 31 March) and ends at 01:00 UTC (02:00 WEST, 03:00 CEST, 04:00 EEST) on the last Sunday in October (between 25 and 31 October) each year; i.e. the change is made at the same absolute time across all time zones. European Union Directive 2000/84/EC makes the observance of summer time mandatory for EU member states (except overseas territories). A proposal to repeal this directive and require that member states observe their own choice (Note: The choice should be either summer or winter time of their current time zone; however, this is not obligatory, so a new time zone could be chosen as well.) year-round was going through the legislative process as of July 2020, but had not seen progress since October 2020.

Summer time lasts 30 weeks in years when the last Sunday in March is after the 28th; otherwise, it is 31 weeks.

== History ==
Summer time was first introduced during the First World War. However, most countries discontinued the practice after the war. It was then restarted in various countries during the Second World War and its immediate aftermath. Again it was widely cancelled by the 1950s, but reintroduced in isolated cases until the late 1960s, when the energy crisis of the late 1960s and early 1970s began to prompt policymakers to reintroduce summer time across the continent. It has remained in place in most European countries since then.

Historically, the countries of Europe had different practices for observing summer time, but this hindered coordination of transport, communications, and movements. Starting in 1981 the European Commission began issuing directives requiring member states to legislate harmonised start and end dates for summer time.

Since 1981, each directive has specified a transition time of 01:00 UTC and a start date of the last Sunday in March, but the end dates have differed. Successive Directives laid down two dates for the end: one on the last Sunday in September applied by the continental Member States, and the other on the fourth Sunday in October for the United Kingdom and Ireland. In 1996 the end date was changed to the fourth Sunday in October for all countries. In 1998 the end date was changed to the last Sunday in October; this happened to be the same as the previous rule for 1996 and 1997. The ninth directive, Directive 2000/84/EC, issued January 2001, specifies this rule and remains in force.

== Efforts to abolish ==
=== 2019 draft directive ===
There were proposals in 2015 and 2016 from members of the European Parliament to abolish summer time observance, but the European Commission did not at that time put forward proposals to be considered, saying it had not found conclusive evidence in favour of a change, and member states were divided. It did, however, note that a cost would be incurred if harmonisation between member states' summer time rules was lost. In 2017 the Finnish and Lithuanian parliaments both voted in favour of proposals calling on the EU to reconsider daylight saving, with similar criticism from Poland and Sweden. The European Commission at the time was reviewing the practice.

On 8 February 2018, the European Parliament voted to ask the European Commission to re-evaluate DST in Europe. After a web survey, that ran from 4 July to 16 August 2018, in which 4.6 million European citizens participated, showed high support for not switching clocks twice annually, on 12 September 2018 the European Commission decided to propose that an end be put to seasonal clock changes (repealing Directive 2000/84/EC). In order for this to be valid, the standard European Union legislative procedure must be followed, including that the Council of the European Union and the European Parliament must both approve the proposal.

Under the proposal, member countries were expected to decide by 31 March 2019 which time they would observe year round. This was however considered a fairly tight timescale by many. The Internet Assigned Numbers Authority, which coordinates changes to the time zone database used by most computers and smartphones, notes that "With less than a year's notice there is a good chance that some computer-based clocks will operate incorrectly after the change, due to delays in propagating updates to software and data." The airline industry pointed out the complexity of revising all airline schedules, particularly in terms of ensuring slot availability on flights outside the EU, and recommended keeping the status quo or deferring the change until at least 2021. An informal meeting of EU transport ministers on 29 October 2018 suggested that many member states would not support the "unrealistic" timetable and that implementation could be pushed back to 2021.

Discussions have shown support for year-round "winter time" in e.g. Denmark, the Netherlands (UTC+01:00), and Finland (UTC+02:00) while permanent summer time was supported in France, Germany and Poland (UTC+02:00), and Cyprus (UTC+03:00). Portugal, Spain, and Italy are in favour of keeping current daylight saving regime.

On 4 March 2019, the European Parliament Transport and Tourism Committee (TRAN) approved the Commission's proposal by 23 votes to 11. The start date was, however, to be postponed until 2021 at the earliest, to ensure a smooth transition, and the Commission is to ensure that countries' decisions to retain winter or summer time are coordinated and do not disrupt the internal market. This decision was confirmed by the full European Parliament on 26 March 2019. Under the draft directive, member states would have chosen whether to remain on their current summer time, in which case the last transition would have been on the last Sunday of March 2021, or their current winter time, which would have taken permanent effect from the last Sunday of October 2021.

In order for the directive to take effect, however, the decision would require approval by the Council of the European Union. As of October 2026, this approval has not yet been obtained. The Council has asked the Commission to produce a detailed impact assessment, but the Commission considers that the onus is on the Member States to find a common position in Council. As a result, progress on the issue is effectively blocked.

=== Effects of Brexit ===
The United Kingdom left the EU on 31 January 2020, before any reform became effective; EU rules continued to apply during the transition period (up until 31 December 2020) but thereafter the UK could choose to make its own arrangements. Thus, if the EU were to abolish summer time while the UK were to continue observing it, Northern Ireland would have a one-hour time difference for 30 or 31 weeks of the year either with the rest of Ireland or with the rest of the UK. In September 2018, the UK Government said that it "has no plans" to end daylight saving.

A consultation by the Irish government found that 80% of those surveyed would not support any measure that resulted in different time zones between Northern Ireland and the Republic. In July 2019, Ireland announced its opposition to the proposed directive and its intent to lobby other EU states on the issue. A qualified majority of 55% of member states representing at least 65% of the European population is required for the Council of Ministers to implement a directive. In the UK, the House of Lords launched a new inquiry in July 2019 to consider the implications of the European changes, explore the preparations that should be made and the factors that should inform the UK's response.

=== Renewed efforts ===
The proposed directive remain assigned to the European Parliament's Committee on Transport and Tourism (TRAN) since 2019 which repeated pushed to break the deadlock. On 23 October 2025, the EU Parliament held a debate in a plenary session on the discontinuation of seasonal changes of time. All speakers, representing the Commission and several parliamentary groups and national delegations agreed that “seasonal changes of time” should stop. However, because the legal mechanism requires a qualified majority of member states and the Council had still not adopted a formal position, the debate concluded without establishing a binding target date or implementation schedule.

=== Proposed timezones ===
Mainland timezones of EU members
| State | Geographical | Winter | Summer | Proposed |
|---|---|---|---|---|
| Portugal | −01:00 | ±00:00 | +01:00 | —N/a |
| Ireland | ±00:00 | ±00:00 | +01:00 | —N/a |
| Netherlands | ±00:00 | +01:00 | +02:00 | +01:00 |
| Belgium | ±00:00 | +01:00 | +02:00 | —N/a |
| Luxembourg | ±00:00 | +01:00 | +02:00 | —N/a |
| France | ±00:00 | +01:00 | +02:00 | +02:00 |
| Spain | ±00:00 | +01:00 | +02:00 | —N/a |
| Sweden | +01:00 | +01:00 | +02:00 | —N/a |
| Denmark | +01:00 | +01:00 | +02:00 | +01:00 |
| Germany | +01:00 | +01:00 | +02:00 | +02:00 |
| Poland | +01:00 | +01:00 | +02:00 | +02:00 |
| Czechia | +01:00 | +01:00 | +02:00 | —N/a |
| Slovakia | +01:00 | +01:00 | +02:00 | —N/a |
| Austria | +01:00 | +01:00 | +02:00 | —N/a |
| Hungary | +01:00 | +01:00 | +02:00 | —N/a |
| Italy | +01:00 | +01:00 | +02:00 | —N/a |
| Slovenia | +01:00 | +01:00 | +02:00 | —N/a |
| Croatia | +01:00 | +01:00 | +02:00 | —N/a |
| Malta | +01:00 | +01:00 | +02:00 | —N/a |
| Finland | +02:00 | +02:00 | +03:00 | +02:00 |
| Estonia | +02:00 | +02:00 | +03:00 | —N/a |
| Latvia | +02:00 | +02:00 | +03:00 | —N/a |
| Lithuania | +02:00 | +02:00 | +03:00 | —N/a |
| Romania | +02:00 | +02:00 | +03:00 | —N/a |
| Bulgaria | +02:00 | +02:00 | +03:00 | —N/a |
| Greece | +02:00 | +02:00 | +03:00 | —N/a |
| Cyprus | +02:00 | +02:00 | +03:00 | +03:00 |

== Table of transition dates for European Summer Time ==
European Summer Time begins (clocks go forward) at 01:00 UTC on the last Sunday in March, and ends (clocks go back) at 01:00 UTC on the last Sunday in October:

| Start | End |
|---|---|
| 28 March 2021 | 31 October 2021 |
| 27 March 2022 | 30 October 2022 |
| 26 March 2023 | 29 October 2023 |
| 31 March 2024 | 27 October 2024 |
| 30 March 2025 | 26 October 2025 |
| 29 March 2026 | 25 October 2026 |
| 28 March 2027 | 31 October 2027 |
| 26 March 2028 | 29 October 2028 |
| 25 March 2029 | 28 October 2029 |
| 31 March 2030 | 27 October 2030 |
| 30 March 2031 | 26 October 2031 |

== Double Summer Time ==
"Double Summer Time" (two hours ahead of local winter time) has been observed on some occasions, notably in 1921, 1941–1945, and 1947. See:

- British Double Summer Time (UTC+02:00)
- Central European Midsummer Time (UTC+03:00)
- Moscow Midsummer Time (UTC+05:00)

== Countries not switching to and from summer time ==
There are five countries that do not use summer time, but keep the same time all year.

Some may be thought of as using "permanent" summer time, since they use time zones allocated to regions further east than themselves.

- Belarus explicitly decided to stay permanently on (what it formerly called) summer time after 2011.
- Greenland moved to permanent summer time (UTC-02:00) in spring 2023.
- Iceland observes UTC+00:00 all year round despite being at longitudes (13°W-24°W) which would indicate UTC-01:00. Iceland's high latitude (the Reykjavík region, home to nearly two-thirds of the country's people, is at 64°N) means that sunset and sunrise times change by many hours over the year, and the effect of changing the clock by one hour would, in comparison, be small.
- Russia used "permanent summer time" from 2011 to 2014. In October 2014 Russia changed permanently back to standard time (UTC+03:00) in the country's west, including Moscow, setting the clocks back one hour at the same time as other European countries did.
- Turkey decided to stop daylight saving time in September 2016, but decided to stay on UTC+03:00 throughout the year rather than switching back to its original time zone UTC+02:00.

Spain, France, Belgium, and the Netherlands may also be thought of as observing "summer time" throughout the winter, and "double-summer time" during summer, because of their positions to the west of the central European time zone.

== Local observations ==
In most of Europe, the word Summer is added to the name of each European time zone during this period: thus, in the UTC+01:00 time zone, Central European Time becomes Central European Summer Time (UTC+02:00).

=== Austria ===
Austria used summer time in 1916–1918, 1920, 1940–1948 (as part of Nazi Germany between 1940 and 1945), and since 1980.

==== Austria-Hungary ====
Austria-Hungary used summer time during World War I in 1916, 1917, and 1918, in line with the German Empire.

=== Bulgaria ===
Summer time was introduced in Bulgaria in 1979 by a regulation of the Bulgarian Council of Ministers. Bulgaria observes the European Union rules for summer time.

=== Croatia ===
Croatia was a part of Yugoslavia as summer time was introduced in 1983. Yugoslavia was the last country in Europe introducing summer time. After gaining independence in the Croatian War of Independence in 1992, Croatia followed the Central European way to change the time on the last Sunday of March and on the last Sunday of October, respectively on the last Sunday of September till 1995.

=== Czech Republic ===
In the Kingdom of Bohemia summer time was used for three seasons during World War I, from 1916 to 1918, while part of the Austro-Hungarian Empire.

During World War II, when the Protectorate of Bohemia and Moravia became a de facto part of Nazi Germany, summer time was used from 1940. In 1940/1941 and 1941/1942, summer time was kept continuously even during the winter.

Czechoslovakia used summer time from 1945 to 1949 and from 1979 to 1992. In winter 1946/1947 (from 1 December to 23 February), winter time (CET+01:00) was used.

The Czech Republic continued to use summer time after the dissolution of Czechoslovakia in 1993.

=== Denmark ===
Summer time has been observed in Denmark since 1980. A national association against summer time (Landsforeningen mod Sommertid) exists, which celebrated the EU commission preliminary decision in August 2018.

==== Faroe Islands ====
The Faroe Islands has observed summer time since 1981. The islands have never been part of the EU, so the decision to observe summer time was its own.

==== Greenland ====
From 1980 to 2023, Greenland observed summer time simultaneously with Europe. In November 2022, the Greenland parliament voted to remain on permanent summer time from spring 2023 onwards. Exceptions, based on company decisions, are the northeastern coast around Danmarkshavn (UTC year-round) for Thule Air Base (which follows Atlantic Time and observes in accordance with US and Canadian rules).

=== Estonia ===
In Estonia summer time was not used in 1990–1996 and 2000–2001. It was used under Soviet rule in 1981–1989.

=== Finland ===
In Finland, summer time has been used on a regular basis since 1981.

A citizens' initiative to abolish daylight saving time was signed by 70,000 Finnish citizens. It was presented to the Finnish parliament in June 2017.

=== France and Monaco ===
France and Monaco follow Central European Time and Central European Summer Time. They apply EU rules regarding the start and end times and dates for summer time.

From 1923 until the Second World War, France and Monaco observed summer time from the last Saturday in March until the first Saturday in October. During the Second World War France also observed summer time. However, after the war the practice was abandoned (since the country changed time zones instituting de facto permanent summer time). In 1976, summer time was reimplemented because of the oil crisis.

Since UTC+00:00 is France's "natural" time zone (extreme points correspond to UTC-0:20 to UTC+0:38), its use of UTC+01:00 in winter could be seen as a form of daylight saving time, while its use of Central European Summer Time (UTC+02:00) in summer can be seen as a form of "double summer time".

=== Germany ===
Summer time was first introduced during World War I by the German Empire from 1916 to 1918. After the end of the war and the proclamation of the Weimar Republic in November 1918, summer time ceased to be observed. Summer time was reintroduced in 1940, during World War II, to try to save energy for the war economy. After the defeat of Germany, summer time was retained by the occupation powers. In 1945, Berlin and the Soviet Occupation Zone even observed Central European Midsummer Time (Mitteleuropäische Hochsommerzeit, MEHSZ; GMT+03:00): in 1947, all of Germany switched to midsummer time from 11 May to 29 June. After the Federal Republic (West Germany) and the German Democratic Republic (East Germany) were established in 1949, summer time again ceased to be observed in 1950.

In 1978, West Germany decided to reintroduce summer time, following the example set by several neighbouring states in the aftermath of the 1973 oil crisis. However, it only came into effect in 1980, after West and East Germany reached an agreement to observe summer time simultaneously from the last Sunday in March (02:00 CET) to the last Sunday in September (03:00 CEST). Thus both German states observed the same time until the German reunification in 1990, after which the reunified Germany retained the laws and thus also the Time Act (Zeitgesetz) of West Germany.

After 1980, West and East Germany; since 1991 reunified Germany: Central European Summer Time.

Büsingen am Hochrhein, a small exclave of Germany entirely surrounded by Swiss territory, did not implement summer time in 1980 but observed the same time as Switzerland; thus there was a one-hour time difference between this village and the rest of Germany. For the tz database, the zone Europe/Busingen was created in its 2013a release, because since the Unix time epoch in 1970, Büsingen am Hochrhein has shared clocks with Zürich, but not with Germany every year.

Germany follows the EU rules regarding the start and end times and dates for summer time.

=== Greece ===
Summer time was first introduced in Greece in 1932, from July 6 to September 1, but the idea was then quickly abandoned.

In the early 1970s and in the aftermath of the 1973 energy crisis that led many European states to implement summer time in order to save energy, Greece reintroduced summer time in 1975 for the period March–September.

Since 1997, Greece follows the EU rules regarding the start and end times and dates for summer time.

=== Hungary ===
Summer time was first introduced in Hungary in 1916, and it was observed until 1919. After that, summer time was in use between 1941–1949 and 1954–1957. Summer time has been in use again since 1980 and follows EU rules.

=== Iceland ===
Iceland uses UTC+00:00 but has not used summer time since April 1968. From 1908 to 1968 Iceland used GMT−01:00. Summer time was used in 1917–1919, 1921 and 1939–1967. The European Union Directive 2000/84/EC is valid also in the European Economic Area, but Iceland has a special exception from it.

=== Ireland ===
In Ireland, Irish Standard Time (IST) (UTC+01, Western European Summer Time) is observed during Summer (March to October). IST is sometimes mistaken for "Irish Summer Time", though this is incorrect. "Winter Time" (UTC+00, WET) is observed in the rest of the year.

(Northern Ireland, as part of the United Kingdom of Great Britain and Northern Ireland, observes UK time. As of March 2022, this is the same as the rest of Ireland).

=== Italy, San Marino, and Vatican City ===
Summer time is known as "ora legale" (literally "legal hour", referencing the fact that it is mandated by law) in Italy, and it has been adopted and abolished several times: it was observed from 1916 to 1920 and between 1940 and 1948. A law was approved in 1965 that took effect the following year, and made the application of summer time mandatory in the whole country. Since 1996, it has been coordinated with the European Union. San Marino and Vatican City State share land borders solely with Italy and observe the same time as in Italy.

=== Netherlands ===
The Netherlands did not use a standardised time until 1909, when Amsterdam Time was introduced. Amsterdam time was 19 minutes and 32 seconds ahead of GMT (Greenwich Meridian time). Later this was corrected to GMT+00:20 for the sake of simplicity.

In 1940 the German occupants forced the Netherlands to observe CEST, Germany's Daylight Saving Time, effectively advancing its time by one hour and 40 minutes. This time stayed in effect year round until 1942, when the normal clock followed the German DST switches.

The use of DST was abandoned directly after the war, and not observed again until 1977, when summer time was observed again, which it still is as of January 2026.

=== Norway ===
In Norway, summer time was observed in 1916, 1940–45, and 1959–65. The arrangement was controversial, and in 1965 the Norwegian parliament (Stortinget) voted to discontinue the practice. Their neighbour, Sweden, did not use it.

However, in 1980 summer time was reintroduced (together with Sweden and Denmark), and since at least 2002 Norway has followed the European Union in this matter.

=== Poland ===
In Poland, "the summer time" was observed in the following years:

- 1916–1919
- 1940–1949
- 1957–1964
- 1977–present

In the years 1979–1995 the last day of summer time was the last Sunday of September. In 1996 it was changed to the last Sunday of October, to synchronise with other countries of the EU.

=== Portugal ===
Most of Portugal operates Western European Time and Western European Summer Time, although the majority of mainland Portugal, west of 7º30'W, was supposed to be operating in UTC-1.

Summer time (locally known as hora de Verão) was introduced in 1916. In the years 1922, 1923, 1925, 1930 and 1933 summer time was not applied. From 1966 to 1976 permanent summer time was applied in Portugal (UTC+1), Madeira (UTC) and Azores (UTC-1).

Since 1912, the official time in Madeira was UTC-1, and in the Azores was UTC-2. However, since 1976 in Madeira (belonging to time zone -1), the official time is the same as that of Continental Portugal (UTC) and, in the Azores (belonging to time zone -2), it is one hour behind (UTC-1) the mainland. The start and end dates for summer time in Portugal follow the pattern in the rest of the EU.

=== Romania ===
Summer time in Romania (locally known by "Ora de Vară") was originally introduced in 1932 (between 22 May and 2 October). Between 1933 and 1940 summer time started on the first Sunday in April and ended on the first Sunday in October. Summer time was abandoned in 1941 and reintroduced in 1979. Since 1997, summer time in Romania follows European Union rules.

=== Russia ===
A decree of the Russian Provisional Government introduced summer time (Russian: летнее время) in Russia on 1 July 1917, and clocks moved one hour forward. A decree of the Soviet government led to the abandonment of this system six months later: clocks moved one hour back again on 28 December.

From 1930, Decree time had the effect of imposing year-round time-zone advances in the Soviet Union.

A decision of the Council of Ministers of the USSR reintroduced summer time in the USSR (Moscow Summer Time, for example) on 1 April 1981, and its practice continued into post-Soviet times until 2011. The changeover dates in Russia were the same as for other European countries, but clocks were moved forward or back at 02:00 local time in all zones. Thus in Moscow (local time = UTC+03:00 in winter, UTC+04:00 in summer), summer time commenced at 02:00 UTC on the day before the last Sunday in March, and ended at 03:00 UTC on the day before the last Sunday in October. ("Day before the last Sunday" is not the same as "the last Saturday" in a month where the last day is a Saturday.)

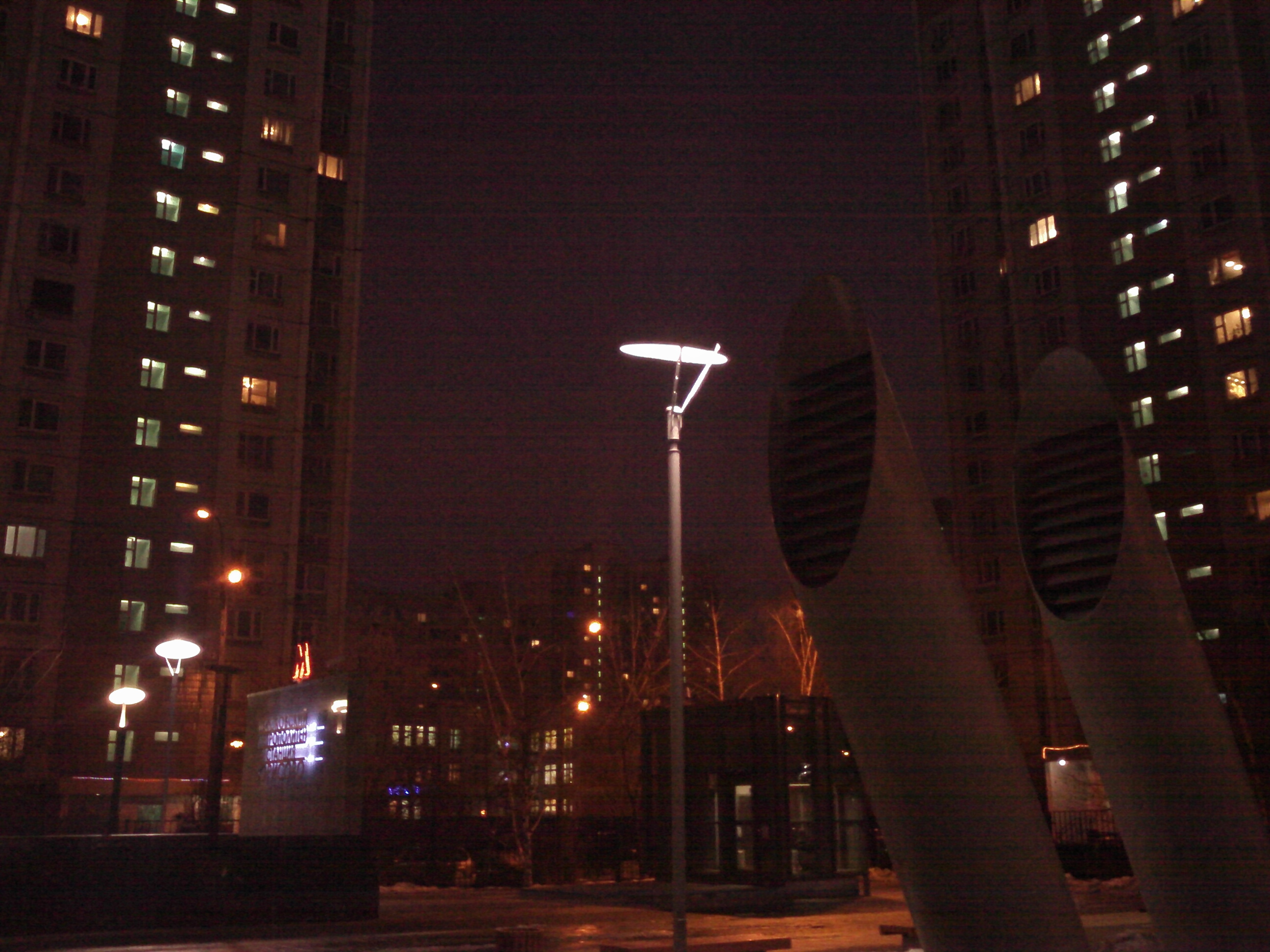
Night black sky at 09:06 (UTC+04:00) on 23 December 2013 in Moscow

On 8 February 2011, Russian President Dmitry Medvedev announced cancellation of biannual clock changes in Russia in favor of a permanent switch to summer time. An hour was added in March 2011 for the last time, and clocks did not move back again. At the same time some of Russia's time zones were consolidated. After this reform many Russian cities had a "standard time" two hours more than would be suggested by their "astronomical time" (because the original standard time was already ahead of astronomical time in many areas).

During his 2012 election campaign, Vladimir Putin proposed re-introducing summer time, as some workers had complained about not seeing any daylight during the winter, since the sun had not risen when they went to work. According to a report in the International Herald Tribune, Russian citizens remembered the winter of 2011–12 as the "darkest winter on record" as a result of the time change. However, Putin later said it would be up to then Prime Minister Medvedev's cabinet to decide how to proceed with a seasonal time shift, and it decided to stay with the 2011 policy.

On 26 October 2014, Russia permanently returned to "winter" time.

=== Slovakia ===
Slovakia used summer time (locally known as Letný čas) in 1916, 1917, and 1918 (as part of the Austro-Hungarian Empire), then again in the early 1940s (as the Slovak Republic (1939–1945), a client-state of Nazi Germany).

In 1979, Slovakia, as part of Czechoslovakia, established that summer time begins annually in the first weekend of April (moved to the last weekend in March in 1981) and ends in the last weekend of September.

After the dissolution of Czechoslovakia in 1993, independent Slovakia continued to use summer time. From 1996, Slovakia has prolonged summer time by about one month so it lasts until the last weekend in October, in accordance with European Union rules.

=== Slovenia ===
Summer time in Slovenia (locally known as "Poletni čas") was introduced on 16 November 1982 to be practised from 1983 on. At that time, Slovenia was one of the Yugoslav republics. The same law was valid until 1996 when the end of summer time was changed from the first Sunday in October to the last Sunday in October. In 2006, the European Union standard was adopted and is still used today.

=== Spain ===
Spain including the Canary Islands has summer time, applying EU rules regarding the start and end times and dates.

In 1918, Spain observed summer time for the first time, and then introduced and abolished several times. It was abolished autumn 1949, and then reintroduced 1974 and has been used since. Spain used GMT+00:00 from 1901 to 1940 and GMT+01:00 from 1940 as standard time. The Canary Islands used GMT-01:00 before 1946 and GMT+00:00 since 1946 as standard time.

Since UTC+00:00 is Spain's "natural" time zone (extreme points, except Canary Islands, correspond to UTC-0:37 to UTC+0:17), its use of UTC+01:00 in winter could be seen as a form of daylight saving time, while its use of Central European Summer Time (UTC+02:00) in summer can be seen as a form of "double summer time".

=== Sweden ===
In Sweden summer time was originally introduced on 15 May 1916. It proved unpopular, and on 30 September in the same year, Sweden returned to year-round standard time. This continued for more than half a century.

On 6 April 1980, Sweden again introduced summer time, and since then summer time has been observed every summer in Sweden. Except for the introduction year 1980, summer time has always started on the last Sunday in March. It ended on the last Sunday in September during the years 1980–1995, and has ended on the last Sunday in October since 1996, following a unification of start/end dates of summer time within the EU as well as in several European countries then outside the EU.

=== Switzerland and Liechtenstein ===
The second last country in Europe (only before Yugoslavia ) to adopt summer time, in 1981, was Switzerland, even though summer time had been rejected by 52.1% of voters in a federal referendum in 1978. Since 1996, Swiss summer time has followed EU regulations. It had formerly been in use in 1941 and 1942. Liechtenstein observes the same time as Switzerland. The German village of Büsingen am Hochrhein, a small exclave entirely surrounded by Swiss territory, also observes the same time as in Switzerland. It did not implement summer time in 1980 and observed the same time as Switzerland, so that in 1980, there was a time difference of one hour during the implementation of summer time in Germany between Büsingen am Hochrhein and the rest of West Germany.

=== Turkey ===
Summer time was introduced in Turkey in 1947, but suspended from 1965 to 1972. Since 1974, Turkey follows European Summer Time.

In 2008, the Turkish Ministry of Energy proposed that Turkey should abolish summer time while at the same time switching to UTC+02:30, originally from 2009 onwards, but when this appeared infeasible, to start in 2011, the plan has not been heard of since.

For the year 2011, Turkey switched to European Summer Time at 03:00 on Monday 28 March, one day later than the rest of Europe, to avoid disrupting the national university entrance examinations held on 27 March.

Once again, for the year 2014, Turkey switched to European Summer Time at 03:00 on Monday 31 March, one day later than the rest of Europe, to avoid disrupting the local elections held on 30 March.

In 2015, Turkey delayed the switch from European Summer Time by 2 weeks, to 04:00 on Sunday 8 November, two weeks later than the rest of Europe, due to the calling of a snap general election on Sunday, 1 November.

In 2016, Turkey scrapped winter time, by permanently staying in UTC+03:00 daylight saving time zone passed Thursday 8 September.

=== Ukraine ===
Summer time was introduced in Ukraine in the early 1980s; from 1981 till 1989 this was Moscow Summer Time; since 1992 Eastern European Summer Time has been used.

On 20 September 2011, the Verkhovna Rada (Ukrainian parliament) voted not to return from Eastern European Summer Time to Eastern European Time. This change would have had the effect of moving Ukraine into the Further-eastern European Time zone UTC+03:00 along with Belarus and western Russia (which do not observe summer time). However, on 18 October 2011 the Parliament canceled these plans and the country returned to Eastern European Time as scheduled. 295 MPs voted in favour out of 349 registered MPs.

On 3 March 2021, the Verkhovna Rada voted on bill No. 4201 "Draft Law on time observation in Ukraine" which will abandon transitioning to summer time and establish year-round standard time on the whole territory of Ukraine. The bill received 277 votes from the 370 MPs present during the first reading. On 19 March, the bill was rejected in a second reading with 212 out of 226 required votes and was sent to an additional second reading instead. On 16 July 2024, the bill passed, and thus the last clock transition was scheduled for 27 October 2024. However, President Volodymyr Zelenskyy did not sign the law, leaving daylight saving time in effect.

The regions of eastern Ukraine under the occupation of Russia, including Crimea, observe Further-eastern European Time.

=== United Kingdom ===
The standard time zone for the whole United Kingdom is Greenwich Mean Time (GMT), (UTC+00:00, WET), which is based on the solar time at Greenwich Observatory, London. The country observes British Summer Time (BST) (UTC+01:00), which is equivalent to WEST used in Portugal and Irish Standard Time in Ireland, in accordance with the standard European timings.

Summer time was first implemented under the Summer Time Act 1916. Subsequent legislation has altered this: the Time (Ireland) Act 1916; the Summer Time Act 1922; Summer Time Act 1925; the Emergency Powers (Defence) Act 1939; the Summer Time Order 1964; the Summer Time Order 1967; the Summer Time Act 1972; the Summer Time Order 1997; and the Summer Time Order 2002.

The UK did not revert to GMT for the three winters of 1968–69, 1969–70 and 1970–71, remaining on BST continuously from 18 February 1968 to 31 October 1971.

The UK was, until 23:00 GMT on 31 January 2020, a member state of the European Union. Since 1996, all clocks in the European Union have changed to summer or winter time on the same dates and at the same moment, at 01:00 UTC+00:00 (Thus summer time ends at 01:59:59 UTC+01:00).

- Summer Time starts: Last Sunday in March
- Summer Time ends: Last Sunday in October

As of August 2020, it appears that the UK government intends to continue to operate winter and summer time on these dates, irrespective of any EU decision on the matter. This may have the effect that Northern Ireland will have a different time zone from the Republic of Ireland.

The Crown Dependencies also observe Greenwich Mean Time and British Summer Time, although under separate legislation. In 2008, Jersey held a referendum to consider moving permanently to Central European Time in winter and Central European Summer Time in summer; however, this was rejected.

None of the UK's fourteen British Overseas Territories observe BST. Gibraltar observes CET and CEST, in line with neighbouring Spain. Due to Gibraltar's longitude, which is further west than much of the UK, it could be considered that Gibraltar is on permanent summer time, and observes double summer time during the summer months.
