= Time in Vatican City =

Time in Vatican City State
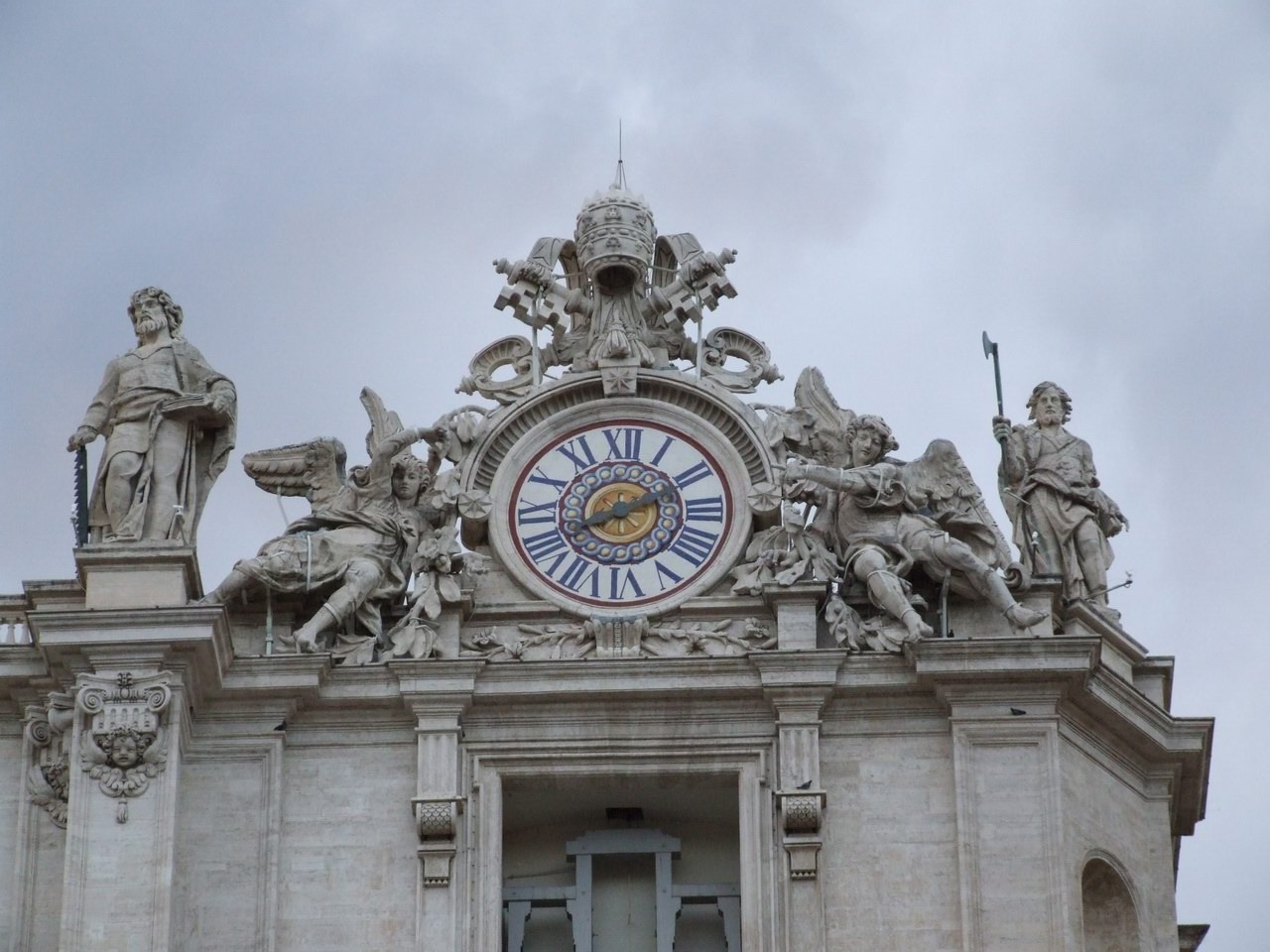
- The Italian clock above the northern corner of the facade of St. Peter's Basilica
- Time zone: Central European Time
- Initials: CET
- UTC offset: UTC+01:00
- Time notation: 24-hour clock

Daylight saving time
- Name: Central European Summer Time
- Initials: CEST
- UTC offset: UTC+02:00
- Start: Last Sunday in March (02:00 CET)
- End: Last Sunday in October (03:00 CEST)

tz database
- Europe/Vatican

Vatican City, a sovereign city-state that is enclaved within Rome, Italy, uses the same time zone as Italy.

Vatican City, alternates between Central European Time (Latin: Hora Europaea Media, Italian: Tempo dell'Europa Centrale, UTC+01:00) and Central European Summer Time (Latin: Hora aestiva Europaea Media, Italian: Orario Estivo dell'Europa Centrale, UTC+02:00), because it follows the European Summer Time annual Daylight saving time (Latin: Tempus aestivum Italian: ora legale) procedure. As such Italy begins observing Central European Summer Time at 02:00 CET on the last Sunday in March and switches back to Central European Time on the last Sunday of October since 1996.

== IANA time zone database ==
In the IANA time zone database, Vatican City is given one zone in the file zone.tab – Europe/Vatican. Data for Vatican City taken directly from zone.tab of the IANA time zone database; columns marked with * are the columns from zone.tab itself:

c.c.*	coordinates*	TZ*	Comments	UTC offset	DST
VA	+415408+0122711	Europe/Vatican		+01:00	+02:00

== See also ==
- Index of Vatican City-related articles
- Time in Europe
- List of time zones by country
- List of time zones by UTC offset
