= Time in Monaco =

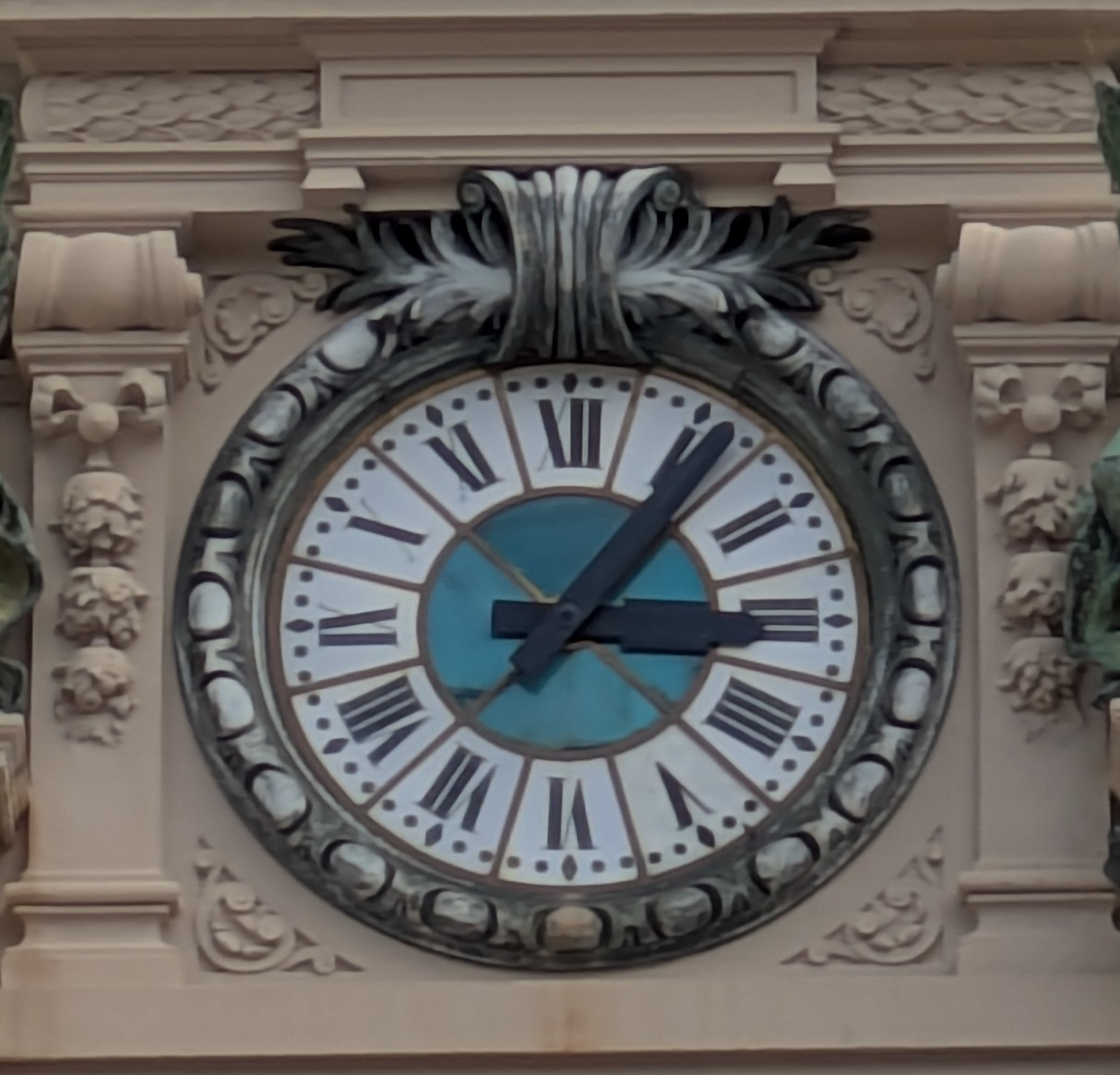
- Clock on the Monte Carlo Casino
- Time zone: Central European Time
- Initials: CET
- UTC offset: UTC+01:00
- Time notation: 24-hour clock

Daylight saving time
- Name: Central European Summer Time
- Initials: CEST
- UTC offset: UTC+02:00
- Start: Last Sunday in March (02:00 CET)
- End: Last Sunday in October (03:00 CEST)

tz database
- Europe/Monaco

In Monaco, the standard time is Central European Time (CET; UTC+01:00). Daylight saving time is observed from the last Sunday in March (02:00 CET) to the last Sunday in October (03:00 CEST). This is shared with several other EU member states.

== History ==
Monaco followed "Paris Mean Time" from 28 March 1911 until after World War II, when Monaco adopted CET.

== IANA time zone database ==
In the IANA time zone database, Monaco is given one zone in the file zone.tab – Europe/Monaco. Data for Monaco taken directly from zone.tab of the IANA time zone database; columns marked with * are the columns from zone.tab itself:

c.c.*	coordinates*	TZ*	Comments	UTC offset	DST
MC	+4342+00723	Europe/Monaco		+01:00	+02:00

== See also ==
- Time in Europe
- List of time zones by country
- List of time zones by UTC offset
