= Time in Andorra =

- Time zone: Central European Time
- Initials: CET
- UTC offset: UTC+01:00
- Time notation: 24 hour clock

Daylight saving time
- Name: Central European Summer Time
- Initials: CEST
- UTC offset: UTC+02:00
- Start: Last Sunday in March (02:00 CET)
- End: Last Sunday in October (03:00 CEST)

tz database
- Europe/Andorra

In Andorra, the standard time is Central European Time (CET; UTC+01:00). Daylight saving time is observed from the last Sunday in March (02:00 CET) to the last Sunday in October (03:00 CEST). Andorra adopted CET after WWII.

== Time notation ==
Andorra uses the 24-hour clock.

== IANA time zone database ==
In the IANA time zone database, Andorra is given the zone Europe/Andorra.

| c.c.* | coordinates* | TZ* | Comments | UTC offset | DST |
|---|---|---|---|---|---|
| AD | +4230+00131 | Europe/Andorra | | +01:00 | +02:00 |

== See also ==
- Time in Europe
- List of time zones by country
- List of time zones by UTC offset
