= List of time zones by country =

This is a list representing time zones by country. Countries are ranked by total number of time zones on their territory. Time zones of a country include that of dependent territories (except Antarctica). France, including its overseas territories, has the most time zones with 12 (13 including its claim in Antarctica). Many countries have daylight saving time, one added hour during the local summer, but this list does not include that information. The UTC offset in the list below is not valid in practice during daylight saving time.

Country	No. of time zones	Time zone	Notes
France	12	UTC−10:00 – Society Islands, Tuamotus, Austral Islands; UTC−09:30 – Marquesas Islands; UTC−09:00 – Gambier Islands; UTC−08:00 – Clipperton Island; UTC−04:00 (AST) – Guadeloupe, Martinique, Saint Barthélemy, Saint Martin; UTC−03:00 (PMST)— French Guiana, Saint Pierre and Miquelon; UTC+01:00 (CET) – Metropolitan France; UTC+03:00 – Mayotte, Scattered Islands in the Indian Ocean; UTC+04:00 – Réunion, Crozet Islands; UTC+05:00 – Kerguelen Islands, Saint Paul and Amsterdam Islands; UTC+11:00 – New Caledonia; UTC+12:00 – Wallis and Futuna	Time in France
Russia	11	UTC+02:00 (Kaliningrad Time) – Kaliningrad Oblast; UTC+03:00 (Moscow Time) – Most of European Russia; UTC+04:00 (Samara Time) – Astrakhan Oblast, Samara Oblast, Saratov Oblast, Udmurtia, and Ulyanovsk Oblast; UTC+05:00 (Yekaterinburg Time) – Bashkortostan, Chelyabinsk Oblast, Khanty–Mansia, Kurgan Oblast, Orenburg Oblast, Perm Krai, Sverdlovsk Oblast, Tyumen Oblast, and Yamalia; UTC+06:00 (Omsk Time) – Omsk Oblast; UTC+07:00 (Krasnoyarsk Time) – Altai Krai, Altai Republic, Kemerovo Oblast, Khakassia, Krasnoyarsk Krai, Novosibirsk Oblast, Tomsk Oblast, and Tuva; UTC+08:00 (Irkutsk Time) – Buryatia and Irkutsk Oblast; UTC+09:00 (Yakutsk Time) – Amur Oblast, western Sakha Republic, and Zabaykalsky Krai; UTC+10:00 (Vladivostok Time) – Jewish Autonomous Oblast, Khabarovsk Krai, Primorsky Krai, and central Sakha Republic; UTC+11:00 (Magadan Time) – Magadan Oblast, eastern Sakha, and Sakhalin Oblast; UTC+12:00 (Kamchatka Time) – Chukotka and Kamchatka Krai	Time in Russia
United States	11	UTC−12:00 (AoE) – Baker Island and Howland Island; UTC−11:00 (ST) – American Samoa, Jarvis Island, Kingman Reef, Midway Atoll and Palmyra Atoll; UTC−10:00 (HT) – Hawaii, most of the Aleutian Islands, and Johnston Atoll; UTC−09:00 (AKT) – Most of the state of Alaska; UTC−08:00 (PT) – Pacific Time zone: the Pacific coast states, the Idaho Panhandle and most of Nevada and Oregon; UTC−07:00 (MT) – Mountain Time zone: most of Idaho, part of Oregon, and the Mountain states plus western parts of some adjacent states UTC−06:00 (CT) – Central Time zone: a large area spanning from the Gulf Coast to the Great Lakes; UTC−05:00 (ET) – Eastern Time zone: roughly a triangle covering all the states from the Great Lakes down to Florida and east to the Atlantic coast UTC−04:00 (AST) – Puerto Rico, the U.S. Virgin Islands; UTC+10:00 (ChT) – Guam and the Northern Mariana Islands; UTC+12:00 (WAKT) – Wake Island	Time in the United States
Antarctica	10	UTC−03:00 (ART) – Palmer Station, Rothera Station; UTC+00:00 (GMT) – Troll Station; UTC+03:00 – Syowa Station; UTC+05:00 – Mawson Station; UTC+06:00 – Vostok Station; UTC+07:00 – Davis Station; UTC+08:00 – Casey Station; UTC+10:00 – Dumont-d'Urville Station; UTC+11:00 – Casey Station; UTC+12:00 – McMurdo Station, Amundsen–Scott South Pole Station	Time in Antarctica
Australia	9	UTC+05:00 – Heard and McDonald Islands; UTC+06:30 – Cocos (Keeling) Islands; UTC+07:00 (CXT) – Christmas Island; UTC+08:00 (AWST) – Western Australia, Indian Pacific railway when travelling between Port Augusta, South Australia and Kalgoorlie, Western Australia); UTC+08:45 (CWT) – South Australia (Border Village), Western Australia (Caiguna, Cocklebiddy, Eucla, Madura, Mundrabilla); UTC+09:30 (ACST) – South Australia, Northern Territory, New South Wales (Yancowinna County); UTC+10:00 (AEST) – Queensland, New South Wales, Australian Capital Territory, Victoria, Tasmania; UTC+10:30 – Lord Howe Island; UTC+11:00 (NFT) – Norfolk Island	Time in Australia
United Kingdom	9	UTC−08:00 – Pitcairn Islands; UTC−05:00 – Cayman Islands, Turks and Caicos Islands; UTC−04:00 (AST) – Anguilla, Bermuda, British Virgin Islands, Montserrat; UTC−03:00 (FKST) – Falkland Islands; UTC−02:00 – South Georgia and the South Sandwich Islands; UTC+00:00 (GMT in winter/BST in summer) – Main territory of the United Kingdom, Saint Helena, Ascension and Tristan da Cunha, Guernsey, Isle of Man, Jersey; UTC+01:00 (CET) – Gibraltar; UTC+02:00 (EET) – Akrotiri and Dhekelia; UTC+06:00 – British Indian Ocean Territory	Time in the United Kingdom
Canada	5	UTC−07:00 (MT) – British Columbia (except East Kootenay and Golden area), Nunavut (west of 102°W and entire Kitikmeot Region), and Yukon; UTC−06:00 (CT) – Alberta, British Columbia (East Kootenay and Golden area), Northwest Territories, Nunavut (between 85°W and 102°W except Kitikmeot Region and Southampton Island), and Saskatchewan (except Creighton area); UTC−05:00 (ET) – Manitoba, Nunavut (east of 85°W and entire Southampton Island), Ontario, Quebec (most of province), and Creighton area in Saskatchewan; UTC−04:00 (AT) – Labrador (all but southeastern tip), New Brunswick, Nova Scotia, Prince Edward Island, eastern Quebec (Le Golfe-du-Saint-Laurent, Listuguj and Magdalen Islands); UTC−03:30 (NT) – Labrador (southeastern), Newfoundland	Time in Canada
New Zealand	5	UTC−11:00 – Niue; UTC−10:00 – Cook Islands; UTC+12:00 – Main territory of New Zealand; UTC+12:45 – Chatham Islands; UTC+13:00 – Tokelau	Time in New Zealand
Brazil	4	UTC−05:00 (Brasília time −2) – Acre and southwestern Amazonas; UTC−04:00 (Brasília time −1) – Most of Amazonas, Mato Grosso, Mato Grosso do Sul, Rondônia, Roraima; UTC−03:00 (Brasília time) – Southeast, South and Northeast regions (except offshore islands), Goiás, Distrito Federal, Tocantins, Pará, Amapá; UTC−02:00 (Brasília time +1) – Offshore islands (Fernando de Noronha, Trindade and Martim Vaz, Rocas Atoll, Saint Peter and Saint Paul Archipelago)	Time in Brazil
Denmark	4	UTC−04:00 – Pituffik Space Base in Greenland; UTC−02:00 – Most of Greenland, including inhabited south coast and west coast UTC+00:00 – East coast of Northeast Greenland National Park, Faroe Islands; UTC+01:00 (CET) – Main territory of Denmark	Time in Denmark
Mexico	4	UTC−08:00 (Zone 4 or Northwest Zone) – State of Baja California; UTC−07:00 (Zone 3 or Pacific Zone) – States of Baja California Sur, Nayarit (except Bahía de Banderas), Sinaloa, Sonora, and northwest border municipalities in Chihuahua; UTC−06:00 (Zone 2 or Central Zone) – Most of Mexico; UTC−05:00 (Zone 1 or Southeast Zone) – State of Quintana Roo	Time in Mexico
Chile	3	UTC−06:00 – Easter Island; UTC−04:00 – Main territory of Chile; UTC−03:00 – Aysén and Magallanes regions	Time in Chile
Indonesia	3	UTC+07:00 (Western Indonesian Standard Time) – Islands of Sumatra, Java, Madura, provinces of Bangka Belitung Islands, Riau Islands, West Kalimantan and Central Kalimantan; UTC+08:00 (Central Indonesian Standard Time) – Islands of Sulawesi, Bali, provinces of East Nusa Tenggara, West Nusa Tenggara, East Kalimantan, North Kalimantan and South Kalimantan; UTC+09:00 (Eastern Indonesian Standard Time) – Maluku Islands and Western New Guinea	Time in Indonesia
Kiribati	3	UTC+12:00 – Gilbert Islands; UTC+13:00 – Phoenix Islands; UTC+14:00 – Line Islands	Time in Kiribati
Democratic Republic of the Congo	2	UTC+01:00 (WAT) – Provinces of Équateur, Kinshasa, Kongo Central, Kwango, Kwilu, Mai-Ndombe, Mongala, Nord-Ubangi, Sud-Ubangi and Tshuapa; UTC+02:00 (CAT) – Provinces of Bas-Uele, Haut-Katanga, Haut-Lomami, Haut-Uele, Kasaï, Kasaï-Central, Kasaï Oriental, Lomami, Lualaba, Maniema, Nord-Kivu, Sankuru, Sud-Kivu, Tanganyika, Tshopo and Ituri Interim Administration	Time in the Democratic Republic of the Congo
Ecuador	2	UTC−06:00 (GALT) – Galápagos Province; UTC−05:00 (Ecuador Time) – Main territory of Ecuador	Time in Ecuador
Federated States of Micronesia	2	UTC+10:00 – States of Chuuk and Yap; UTC+11:00 – States of Kosrae and Pohnpei	Time in the Federated States of Micronesia
Kingdom of the Netherlands	2	UTC−04:00 (AST) – Caribbean municipalities and constituent countries UTC+01:00 (CET) – Main territory of the Netherlands	Time in the Netherlands
Mongolia	2	UTC+07:00 – Provinces of Khovd, Uvs and Bayan-Ölgii; UTC+08:00 – Most of the country	Time in Mongolia
Papua New Guinea	2	UTC+10:00 – Most of the country UTC+11:00 – Autonomous Region of Bougainville (Bougainville Standard Time)	Time in Papua New Guinea
Portugal	2	UTC−01:00 – Azores; UTC+00:00 (WET) – Madeira and the Main territory of Portugal	Time in Portugal
South Africa	2	UTC+02:00 (South African Standard Time) – Main territory of South Africa; UTC+03:00 – Prince Edward Islands	Time in South Africa
Spain	2	UTC+00:00 (WET) – Canary Islands; UTC+01:00 (CET) – Main territory of Spain	Time in Spain
Afghanistan	1	UTC+04:30	Time in Afghanistan
Albania	1	UTC+01:00 (CET)	Time in Albania
Algeria	1	UTC+01:00 (CET)	Time in Algeria
Andorra	1	UTC+01:00 (CET)	Time in Andorra
Angola	1	UTC+01:00 (WAT)	Time in Angola
Antigua and Barbuda	1	UTC−04:00 (AST)	
Argentina	1	UTC−03:00 (ART)	Time in Argentina
Armenia	1	UTC+04:00	Time in Armenia
Austria	1	UTC+01:00 (CET)	Time in Austria
Azerbaijan	1	UTC+04:00	Time in Azerbaijan
Bahamas	1	UTC−05:00 (EST)	Time in the Bahamas
Bahrain	1	UTC+03:00	Time in Bahrain
Bangladesh	1	UTC+06:00 (BST)	Time in Bangladesh
Barbados	1	UTC−04:00	Time in Barbados
Belarus	1	UTC+03:00 (MSK)	Time in Belarus
Belgium	1	UTC+01:00 (CET)	Time in Belgium
Belize	1	UTC−06:00	Time in Belize
Benin	1	UTC+01:00 (WAT)	Time in Benin
Bhutan	1	UTC+06:00 (BTT)	Time in Bhutan
Bolivia	1	UTC−04:00	Time in Bolivia
Bosnia and Herzegovina	1	UTC+01:00 (CET)	Time in Bosnia and Herzegovina
Botswana	1	UTC+02:00 (CAT)	Time in Botswana
Brunei	1	UTC+08:00	Time in Brunei
Bulgaria	1	UTC+02:00 (EET)	Time in Bulgaria
Burkina Faso	1	UTC+00:00	
Burundi	1	UTC+02:00 (CAT)	Time in Burundi
Cambodia	1	UTC+07:00	Time in Cambodia
Cameroon	1	UTC+01:00 (WAT)	Time in Cameroon
Cape Verde	1	UTC−01:00 (Cape Verde Time)	Time in Cape Verde
Central African Republic	1	UTC+01:00 (WAT)	
Chad	1	UTC+01:00 (WAT)	
China	1	UTC+08:00 (CST) (only uses Xinjiang Time unofficially in Tibet and Xinjiang)	Time in China
Colombia	1	UTC−05:00	Time in Colombia
Comoros	1	UTC+03:00 (EAT)	Time in Comoros
Republic of the Congo	1	UTC+01:00 (WAT)	Time in the Republic of the Congo
Costa Rica	1	UTC−06:00	Time in Costa Rica
Croatia	1	UTC+01:00 (CET)	Time in Croatia
Cuba	1	UTC−05:00	Time in Cuba
Cyprus	1	UTC+02:00 (EET)	Time in Cyprus
Czech Republic	1	UTC+01:00 (CET) (CRT)	Time in the Czech Republic
Djibouti	1	UTC+03:00 (EAT)	Time in Djibouti
Dominica	1	UTC−04:00	Time in Dominica
Dominican Republic	1	UTC−04:00	Time in the Dominican Republic
Egypt	1	UTC+02:00 (EET)	Time in Egypt
El Salvador	1	UTC−06:00	Time in El Salvador
Equatorial Guinea	1	UTC+01:00 (WAT)	Time in Equatorial Guinea
Eritrea	1	UTC+03:00 (EAT)	Time in Eritrea
Estonia	1	UTC+02:00 (EET)	Time in Estonia
Eswatini	1	UTC+02:00	Time in Eswatini
Ethiopia	1	UTC+03:00 (EAT)	Time in Ethiopia
Fiji	1	UTC+12:00	Time in Fiji
Finland	1	UTC+02:00 (EET)	Time in Finland
Gabon	1	UTC+01:00 (WAT)	Time in Gabon
Gambia	1	UTC+00:00	Time in Gambia
Georgia	1	UTC+04:00	Time in Georgia
Germany	1	UTC+01:00 (CET)	Time in Germany
Ghana	1	UTC+00:00	Time in Ghana
Greece	1	UTC+02:00 (EET)	Time in Greece
Grenada	1	UTC−04:00	Time in Grenada
Guatemala	1	UTC−06:00	Time in Grenada
Guinea	1	UTC+00:00	Time in Guinea
Guinea-Bissau	1	UTC+00:00	Time in Guinea-Bissau
Guyana	1	UTC−04:00	Time in Guyana
Haiti	1	UTC−05:00	Time in Haiti
Honduras	1	UTC−06:00	Time in Honduras
Hong Kong	1	UTC+08:00 (HKT)	Time in Hong Kong
Hungary	1	UTC+01:00 (CET)	Time in Hungary
Iceland	1	UTC+00:00	Time in Iceland
India	1	UTC+05:30 (IST)	Time in India
Iran	1	UTC+03:30 (IRST)	Time in Iran
Iraq	1	UTC+03:00	Time in Iraq
Ireland	1	UTC+00:00 (WET)	Time in Ireland
Israel	1	UTC+02:00 (IST)	Time in Israel
Italy	1	UTC+01:00 (CET)	Time in Italy
Ivory Coast	1	UTC+00:00	Time in Ivory Coast
Jamaica	1	UTC−05:00	Time in Jamaica
Japan	1	UTC+09:00 (JST)	Time in Japan
Jordan	1	UTC+03:00	Time in Jordan
Kazakhstan	1	UTC+05:00	Time in Kazakhstan
Kenya	1	UTC+03:00 (EAT)	Time in Kenya
North Korea	1	UTC+09:00 (Pyongyang Time)	Time in North Korea
South Korea	1	UTC+09:00 (Korea Standard Time)	Time in South Korea
Kuwait	1	UTC+03:00 (Arabia Standard Time)	Time in Kuwait
Kyrgyzstan	1	UTC+06:00	Time in Kyrgyzstan
Laos	1	UTC+07:00	Time in Laos
Latvia	1	UTC+02:00 (EET)	Time in Latvia
Lebanon	1	UTC+02:00 (EET)	Time in Lebanon
Lesotho	1	UTC+02:00	Time in Lesotho
Liberia	1	UTC+00:00	Time in Liberia
Libya	1	UTC+02:00 (EET)	
Liechtenstein	1	UTC+01:00 (CET)	Time in Liechtenstein
Lithuania	1	UTC+02:00 (EET)	Time in Lithuania
Luxembourg	1	UTC+01:00 (CET)	Time in Luxembourg
Macau	1	UTC+08:00 (Macau Standard Time)	Time in Macau
Madagascar	1	UTC+03:00 (EAT)	Time in Madagascar
Malawi	1	UTC+02:00 (CAT)	Time in Malawi
Malaysia	1	UTC+08:00 (Malaysian Standard Time)	Time in Malaysia
Maldives	1	UTC+05:00	Time in the Maldives
Mali	1	UTC+00:00	
Malta	1	UTC+01:00 (CET)	Time in Malta
Marshall Islands	1	UTC+12:00	Time in the Marshall Islands
Mauritania	1	UTC+00:00	Time in Mauritania
Mauritius	1	UTC+04:00 (Mauritius Time)	Time in Mauritania
Moldova	1	UTC+02:00 (EET)	Time in Moldova
Monaco	1	UTC+01:00 (CET)	Time in Monaco
Montenegro	1	UTC+01:00 (CET)	Time in Montenegro
Morocco	1	UTC+00:00	Time in Morocco
Mozambique	1	UTC+02:00 (CAT)	Time in Mozambique
Myanmar	1	UTC+06:30 (Myanmar Standard Time)	Time in Myanmar
Namibia	1	UTC+02:00 (CAT)	Time in Namibia
Nauru	1	UTC+12:00	
Nepal	1	UTC+05:45 (Nepal Time)	Time in Nepal
Nicaragua	1	UTC−06:00	Time in Nicaragua
Niger	1	UTC+01:00 (WAT)	
Nigeria	1	UTC+01:00 (WAT)	
North Macedonia	1	UTC+01:00 (CET)	Time in North Macedonia
Norway	1	UTC+01:00 (CET)	Time in Norway
Oman	1	UTC+04:00	Time in Oman
Pakistan	1	UTC+05:00 (PKT)	Time in Pakistan
Palau	1	UTC+09:00	Time in Palau
Palestine	1	UTC+02:00	Time in Palestine
Panama	1	UTC−05:00	Time in Panama
Paraguay	1	UTC−03:00	Time in Paraguay
Peru	1	UTC−05:00 (PET)	Time in Peru
Philippines	1	UTC+08:00 (PHT)	Time in Philippines
Poland	1	UTC+01:00 (CET)	Time in Poland
Qatar	1	UTC+03:00 (Arabia Standard Time)	Time in Qatar
Romania	1	UTC+02:00 (EET)	Time in Romania
Rwanda	1	UTC+02:00 (CAT)	Time in Rwanda
Saint Kitts and Nevis	1	UTC−04:00	
Saint Lucia	1	UTC−04:00	
Saint Vincent and the Grenadines	1	UTC−04:00	
Samoa	1	UTC+13:00	Time in Samoa
San Marino	1	UTC+01:00 (CET)	
São Tomé and Príncipe	1	UTC+00:00	Time in São Tomé and Príncipe
Saudi Arabia	1	UTC+03:00 (Arabia Standard Time)	Time in Saudi Arabia
Senegal	1	UTC+00:00	Time in Senegal
Serbia	1	UTC+01:00 (CET)	Time in Serbia
Seychelles	1	UTC+04:00 (Seychelles Time)	Time in Seychelles
Sierra Leone	1	UTC+00:00	Time in Sierra Leone
Singapore	1	UTC+08:00 (SST)	Time in Singapore
Slovakia	1	UTC+01:00 (CET)	Time in Slovakia
Slovenia	1	UTC+01:00 (CET)	Time in Slovenia
Solomon Islands	1	UTC+11:00	Time in Solomon Islands
Somalia	1	UTC+03:00 (EAT)	
South Sudan	1	UTC+02:00 (CAT)	Time in South Sudan
Sri Lanka	1	UTC+05:30 (SLST)	Time in Sri Lanka
Sudan	1	UTC+02:00	Time in Sudan
Suriname	1	UTC−03:00	Time in Suriname
Sweden	1	UTC+01:00 (CET)	Time in Sweden
Switzerland	1	UTC+01:00 (CET)	Time in Switzerland
Syria	1	UTC+03:00 (EET)	Time in Syria
Taiwan	1	UTC+08:00	Time in Taiwan
Tajikistan	1	UTC+05:00	Time in Tajikistan
Tanzania	1	UTC+03:00 (EAT)	Time in Tanzania
Timor-Leste	1	UTC+09:00	Time in Timor-Leste
Thailand	1	UTC+07:00 (THA)	Time in Thailand
Togo	1	UTC+00:00	Time in Togo
Tonga	1	UTC+13:00	Time in Tonga
Trinidad and Tobago	1	UTC−04:00 (AST)	Time in Trinidad and Tobago
Tunisia	1	UTC+01:00 (CET)	Time in Tunisia
Turkey	1	UTC+03:00 (TRT)	Time in Turkey
Turkmenistan	1	UTC+05:00	Time in Turkmenistan
Tuvalu	1	UTC+12:00	Time in Tuvalu
Uganda	1	UTC+03:00 (EAT)	Time in Uganda
Ukraine	1	UTC+02:00 (EET)	Time in Ukraine
United Arab Emirates	1	UTC+04:00	Time in the United Arab Emirates
Uruguay	1	UTC−03:00	Time in Uruguay
Uzbekistan	1	UTC+05:00 (Uzbekistan Time)	Time in Uzbekistan
Vanuatu	1	UTC+11:00	Time in Vanuatu
Vatican City	1	UTC+01:00 (CET)	Time in Vatican City
Venezuela	1	UTC−04:00	Time in Venezuela
Vietnam	1	UTC+07:00 (Indochina Time)	Time in Vietnam
Yemen	1	UTC+03:00	Time in Yemen
Zambia	1	UTC+02:00 (CAT)	Time in Zambia
Zimbabwe	1	UTC+02:00 (CAT)	Time in Zimbabwe

== See also ==
- Lists of time zones
- List of UTC time offsets
- Time zone abolition
