= Time in Slovenia =

- Time zone: Central European Time
- Initials: CET
- UTC offset: UTC+01:00
- Time notation: 12-hour clock and 24-hour clock
- Adopted: 1 October 1891 (as the Austro-Hungarian Empire)

Daylight saving time
- Name: Central European Summer Time
- Initials: CEST
- UTC offset: UTC+02:00
- Start: Last Sunday in March (02:00 CET)
- End: Last Sunday in October (03:00 CEST)
- In use since: 1983

tz database
- Europe/Ljubljana

In Slovenia, the standard time is Central European Time (Slovene: Srednjeevropski čas; CET; UTC+01:00). Daylight saving time is observed from the last Sunday in March (02:00 CET) to the last Sunday in October (03:00 CEST). This is shared with several other EU member states.

== History ==
The Austro-Hungarian Empire adopted CET on 1 October 1891. Slovenia would continue to observe CET after independence, and observed daylight saving time between 1941 and 1946, and again since 1983.

== Notation ==
Slovenia uses both the 12-hour and 24-hour clock.

== IANA time zone database ==
In the IANA time zone database, Slovenia is given one zone in the file zone.tab – Europe/Ljubljana. Data for Slovenia directly from zone.tab of the IANA time zone database; columns marked with * are the columns from zone.tab itself:

c.c.*	coordinates*	TZ*	Comments	UTC offset	DST
SI	+4603+01431	Europe/Ljubljana		+01:00	+02:00

== See also ==
- Time in Europe
- List of time zones by country
- List of time zones by UTC offset
