= Time in Sweden =

- Time zone: Central European Time
- Initials: CET
- UTC offset: UTC+01:00
- Time notation: 24-hour clock
- Adopted: 1900

Daylight saving time
- Name: Central European Summer Time
- Initials: CEST
- UTC offset: UTC+02:00
- Start: Last Sunday in March (02:00 CET)
- End: Last Sunday in October (03:00 CEST)

tz database
- Europe/Stockholm

In Sweden, the standard time is Central European Time (CET; UTC+01:00; Swedish: centraleuropeisk tid). Daylight saving time is observed from the last Sunday in March (02:00 CET) to the last Sunday in October (03:00 CEST). Sweden adopted CET in 1900.

== Time notation ==
Times are written with the 24-hour clock, with colon as separators. Historically full stops were more common so both can be seen.

== IANA time zone database ==
In the IANA time zone database, Sweden is given Europe/Stockholm.

c.c.*	coordinates*	TZ*	Comments	UTC offset	DST
SE	+5920+01803	Europe/Stockholm		+01:00	+02:00

== See also ==
- Time in Europe
- List of time zones by country
- List of time zones by UTC offset
- Swedish calendar
