= Time in Ghana =

- Time zone: Greenwich Mean Time
- Initials: GMT
- UTC offset: UTC+00:00
- Standard meridian: 7th parallel north
- Time notation: 24-hour clock
- Adopted: 2 November 1915; 24 October 1945 (readopted)

Daylight saving time
- DST not observed

tz database
- Africa/Accra

The western African country Ghana observes a single time zone, denoted as Greenwich Mean Time (GMT; UTC+00:00). Ghana shares this time zone with several other countries, including fourteen in western Africa where it was formerly known as Western Sahara Standard Time (WSST). Ghana does not have an associated daylight saving time (DST). It previously observed DST as the erstwhile Gold Coast under British rule between 1919 and 1942, and 1950 and 1956.

== History ==
Ghana, as the erstwhile British Gold Coast colony, adopted Greenwich Mean Time (UTC+00:00) on 2 November 1915 via the Interpretation Amendment Ordinance. Daylight saving time (DST) was first introduced in 1919, advancing the clock twenty minutes to UTC+00:20 at 02:00 (local time) on the first day of September and reverting to UTC+00:00 – the standard time – on the first day of January at 02:00. In 1940, the start date was changed to 1 May. DST was briefly abolished with UTC+00:30 adopted as standard time between 1942 and 1945, before both changes were revoked and UTC+00:00 was readopted as standard time. DST was abolished the same year, however, but briefly reintroduced again for the final time between 1950 and 1956 with a thirty-minute offset from UTC.

== IANA time zone database ==
In the IANA time zone database, Ghana is given one zone in the file zone.tab – Africa/Accra. "GH" refers to the country's ISO 3166-1 alpha-2 country code. Data for Ghana directly from zone.tab of the IANA time zone database; columns marked with * are the columns from zone.tab itself:

c.c.*	coordinates*	TZ*	Comments	UTC offset	DST
GH	+0533−00013	Africa/Accra		+00:00	+00:00

== See also ==
- List of time zones by country
- List of UTC time offsets
- Western Sahara Standard Time
