= Time in Guinea =

- Time zone: Greenwich Mean Time
- Initials: GMT
- UTC offset: UTC+00:00

Daylight saving time
- DST not observed

tz database
- Africa/Conakry

Time in Guinea is given by a single time zone, denoted as Greenwich Mean Time (GMT; UTC+00:00). Guinea shares this time zone with several other countries, including fourteen in western Africa. Guinea does not observe daylight saving time (DST).

== History ==
French Guinea—the French colonial possession that preceded Guinea—first adopted UTC−01:00 on 1 January 1912.

== IANA time zone database ==
In the IANA time zone database, Guinea is given one zone in the file zone.tab – Africa/Conakry, which is an alias to Africa/Abidjan. "GN" refers to the country's ISO 3166-1 alpha-2 country code. Data for Guinea directly from zone.tab of the IANA time zone database; columns marked with * are the columns from zone.tab itself:

c.c.*	coordinates*	TZ*	Comments	UTC offset	DST
GN	+0931−01343	Africa/Conakry		+00:00	+00:00

== See also ==
- Time in Africa
- List of time zones by country
