= Time in Benin =

- Time zone: West Africa Time
- Initials: WAT
- UTC offset: UTC+01:00
- Adopted: 1 January 1912

Daylight saving time
- DST not observed

tz database
- Africa/Porto-Novo

Time in Benin is given by a single time zone, officially denoted as West Africa Time (WAT; UTC+01:00). Benin adopted WAT on 1 January 1912 as French Dahomey, and has never observed daylight saving time.

== IANA time zone database ==
In the IANA time zone database, Benin is given one zone in the file zone.tab – Africa/Porto-Novo. "BJ" refers to the country's ISO 3166-1 alpha-2 country code. Data for Benin directly from zone.tab of the IANA time zone database; columns marked with * are the columns from zone.tab itself:

| c.c.* | coordinates* | TZ* | Comments | UTC offset | DST |
|---|---|---|---|---|---|
| BJ | +0629+00237 | Africa/Porto-Novo | | +01:00 | +01:00 |

== See also ==
- List of time zones by country
- List of UTC time offsets
