= Time in Austria =

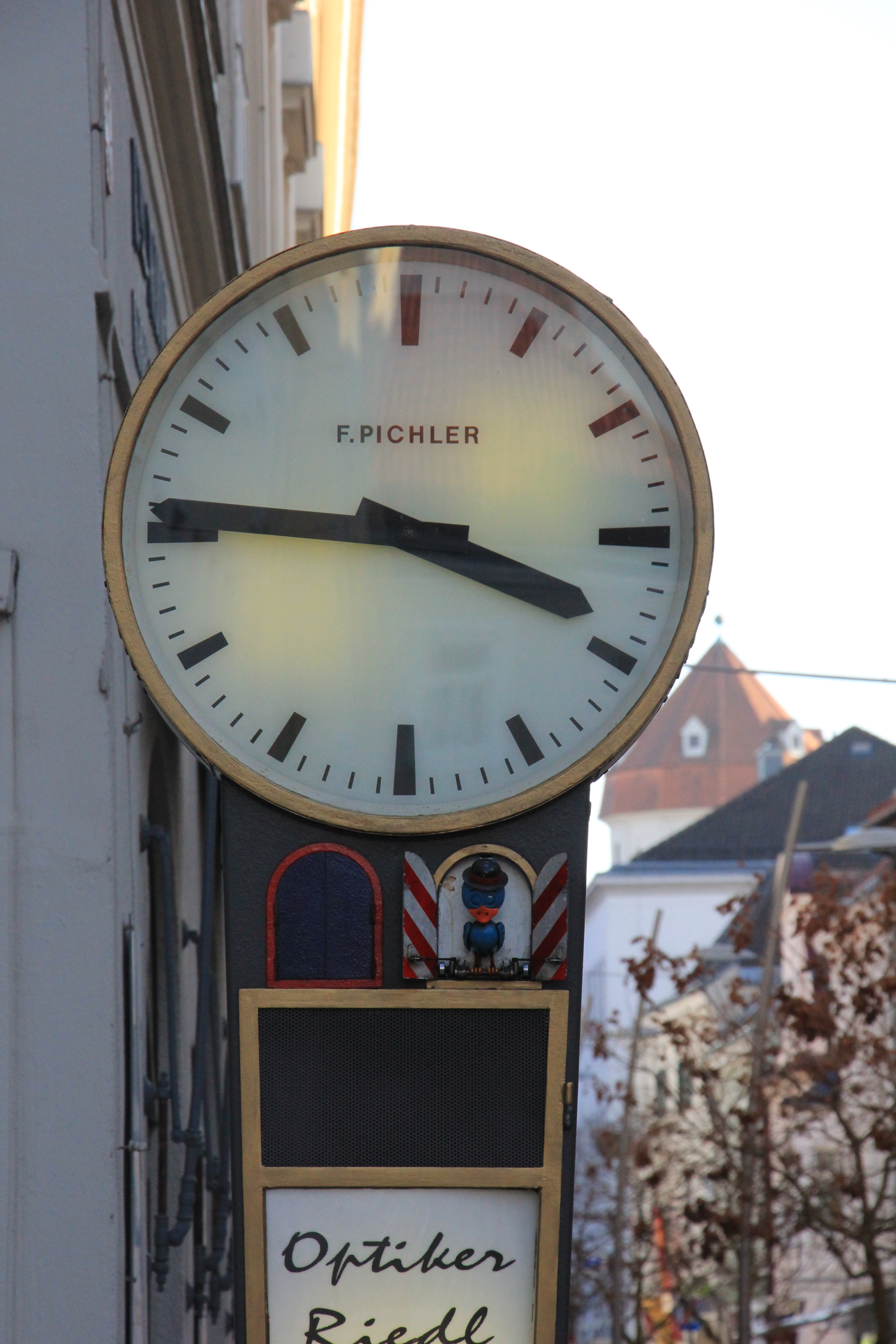
- A clock tower in Austria
- Time zone: Central European Time
- Initials: CET
- UTC offset: UTC+01:00
- Adopted: 1 October 1891 (Prague and Budapest); 1 April 1893 (Vienna)

Daylight saving time
- Name: Central European Summer Time
- Initials: CEST
- UTC offset: UTC+02:00
- Start: Last Sunday in March (02:00 CET)
- End: Last Sunday in October (03:00 CEST)

tz database
- Europe/Vienna

In Austria, the standard time is Central European Time (Note: German: Mitteleuropäische Zeit; MEZ) (CET; UTC+01:00). Daylight saving time is observed from the last Sunday in March (02:00 CET) to the last Sunday in October (03:00 CEST).

== History ==
The Austro-Hungarian Empire adopted CET on 1 October 1891. At first railways and post offices, cities such as Prague and Budapest; however, not Vienna. Vienna eventually adopted CET on 1 April 1893.

== IANA time zone database ==
In the IANA time zone database, Austria is given the zone Europe/Vienna.

c.c.*	coordinates*	TZ*	Comments	UTC offset	DST
AT	+4813+01620	Europe/Vienna		+01:00	+02:00

== See also ==
- Time in Europe
- List of time zones by country
- List of time zones by UTC offset
