= Time in Zambia =

- Time zone: Central Africa Time
- Initials: CAT
- UTC offset: UTC+02:00
- Adopted: 1903 (as North-Eastern Rhodesia)

Daylight saving time
- DST not observed

tz database
- Africa/Lusaka

Time in Zambia is given by a single time zone, officially denoted as Central Africa Time (CAT; UTC+02:00). Zambia does not observe daylight saving time. Zambia, as North-Eastern Rhodesia, has observed CAT since 1903.

== IANA time zone database ==
In the IANA time zone database, Zambia is given one zone in the file zone.tab – Africa/Lusaka. "ZM" refers to the country's ISO 3166-1 alpha-2 country code. Data for Zambia directly from zone.tab of the IANA time zone database; columns marked with * are the columns from zone.tab itself:

c.c.*	coordinates*	TZ*	Comments	UTC offset	DST
ZM	−1525+02817	Africa/Lusaka		+02:00	+02:00

== See also ==
- List of time zones by country
- List of UTC time offsets
