= Time in Mozambique =

- Time zone: Central Africa Time
- Initials: CAT
- UTC offset: UTC+02:00
- Adopted: 1903 (de facto); 26 May 1911 (de jure)

Daylight saving time
- DST not observed

tz database
- Africa/Maputo

Time in Mozambique is given by a single time zone, officially denoted as Central Africa Time (CAT; UTC+02:00). Mozambique has never observed daylight saving time.

== History ==
Mozambique adopted UTC+02:00 (Central Africa Time; CAT) unofficially in 1903, and officially on 26 May 1911.

== IANA time zone database ==
In the IANA time zone database, Mozambique is given one zone in the file zone.tab – Africa/Maputo. "MZ" refers to the country's ISO 3166-1 alpha-2 country code. Data for Mozambique directly from zone.tab of the IANA time zone database; columns marked with * are the columns from zone.tab itself:

c.c.*	coordinates*	TZ*	Comments	UTC offset	DST
MZ	−2558+03235	Africa/Maputo	Central Africa Time	+02:00	+02:00

== See also ==
- List of time zones by country
- List of UTC time offsets
