= Time in Cameroon =

- Time zone: West Africa Time
- Initials: WAT
- UTC offset: UTC+01:00
- Adopted: 1 January 1912

Daylight saving time
- DST not observed

tz database
- Africa/Douala

Time in Cameroon is given by a single time zone, officially denoted as West Africa Time (WAT; UTC+01:00). Cameroon adopted WAT on 1 January 1912 as Cameroun, and has never observed daylight saving time.

== IANA time zone database ==
In the IANA time zone database, Cameroon is given one zone in the file zone.tab – Africa/Douala. "CM" refers to the country's ISO 3166-1 alpha-2 country code. Data for Cameroon directly from zone.tab of the IANA time zone database; columns marked with * are the columns from zone.tab itself:

c.c.*	coordinates*	TZ*	Comments	UTC offset	DST
CM	+0403+00942	Africa/Douala		+01:00	+01:00

== See also ==
- List of time zones by country
- List of UTC time offsets
