= Time in the Gambia =

- Time zone: Greenwich Mean Time
- Initials: GMT
- UTC offset: UTC+00:00
- Adopted: 1918

Daylight saving time
- DST not observed

tz database
- Africa/Banjul

Time in the Gambia is given by a single time zone, denoted as Greenwich Mean Time (GMT; UTC+00:00). Adopted in 1918, the Gambia has never observed daylight saving time (DST).

== IANA time zone database ==
In the IANA time zone database, the Gambia is given one zone in the file zone.tab – Africa/Banjul. "GM" refers to the country's ISO 3166-1 alpha-2 country code. Data for the Gambia directly from zone.tab of the IANA time zone database; columns marked with * are the columns from zone.tab itself:

c.c.*	coordinates*	TZ*	Comments	UTC offset	DST
GM	+1328−01639	Africa/Banjul		+00:00	+00:00

== See also ==
- List of time zones by country
- List of UTC time offsets
