= Time in Mauritania =

- Time zone: Greenwich Mean Time
- Initials: GMT
- UTC offset: UTC+00:00

Daylight saving time
- DST not observed

tz database
- Africa/Nouakchott

Time in Mauritania is given by a single time zone, denoted as Greenwich Mean Time (GMT; UTC+00:00). Mauritania shares this time zone with several other countries, including fourteen in western Africa. Mauritania does not observe daylight saving time (DST).

== IANA time zone database ==
In the IANA time zone database, Mauritania is given one zone in the file zone.tab – Africa/Nouakchott, which is an alias to Africa/Abidjan. "MR" refers to the country's ISO 3166-1 alpha-2 country code. Data for Mauritania directly from zone.tab of the IANA time zone database; columns marked with * are the columns from zone.tab itself:

| c.c.* | coordinates* | TZ* | Comments | UTC offset | DST |
|---|---|---|---|---|---|
| MR | +1806−01557 | Africa/Nouakchott | | +00:00 | +00:00 |

== See also ==
- Time in Africa
- List of time zones by country
