= Time in Malawi =

- Time zone: Central Africa Time
- Initials: CAT
- UTC offset: UTC+02:00

Daylight saving time
- DST not observed

tz database
- Africa/Blantyre

Time in Malawi is given by a single time zone, officially denoted as Central Africa Time (CAT; UTC+02:00). Malawi does not observe daylight saving time.

== IANA time zone database ==
In the IANA time zone database, Malawi is given one zone in the file zone.tab – Africa/Blantyre. "MW" refers to the country's ISO 3166-1 alpha-2 country code. Data for Malawi directly from zone.tab of the IANA time zone database; columns marked with * are the columns from zone.tab itself:

c.c.*	coordinates*	TZ*	Comments	UTC offset	DST
MW	−1547+03500	Africa/Blantyre		+02:00	+02:00

== See also ==
- List of time zones by country
- List of UTC time offsets
