= Time in Slovakia =

- Time zone: Central European Time
- Initials: CET
- UTC offset: UTC+01:00

Daylight saving time
- Name: Central European Summer Time
- Initials: CEST
- UTC offset: UTC+02:00
- Start: Last Sunday in March (02:00 CET)
- End: Last Sunday in October (03:00 CEST)

tz database
- Europe/Bratislava

In Slovakia, the standard time is Central European Time (UTC+01:00). Daylight saving time is observed from the last Sunday in March (02:00 CET) to the last Sunday in October (03:00 CEST). This is shared with several other EU member states.

== IANA time zone database ==
The IANA time zone database gives Slovakia Europe/Bratislava.

c.c.*	coordinates*	TZ*	Comments	UTC offset	DST
SK	+4809+01707	Europe/Bratislava		+01:00	+02:00

== See also ==
- Time in Europe
- List of time zones by country
- List of time zones by UTC offset
