= Time in Uganda =

- Time zone: East Africa Time
- Initials: EAT
- UTC offset: UTC+03:00

Daylight saving time
- DST not observed

tz database
- Africa/Kampala

Time in Uganda is given by a single time zone, officially denoted as East Africa Time (EAT; UTC+03:00). Uganda does not observe daylight saving time.

== Technical details ==
In the IANA time zone database, Uganda is given one zone in the file zone.tab – Africa/Kampala, which is an alias to Africa/Nairobi. "UG" refers to the country's ISO 3166-1 alpha-2 country code. Data for Uganda directly from zone.tab of the IANA time zone database; columns marked with * are the columns from zone.tab itself:

c.c.*	coordinates*	TZ*	Comments	UTC offset	DST
UG	+0019+03225	Africa/Kampala		+03:00	+03:00

== See also ==
- Time in Africa
- List of time zones by country
- List of UTC time offsets
