= Time in Luxembourg =

- Time zone: Central European Time
- Initials: CET
- UTC offset: UTC+01:00
- Adopted: 1904–1918; 1940 (readopted)

Daylight saving time
- Name: Central European Summer Time
- Initials: CEST
- UTC offset: UTC+02:00
- Start: Last Sunday in March (02:00 CET)
- End: Last Sunday in October (03:00 CEST)

tz database
- Europe/Luxembourg

In Luxembourg, the standard time is Central European Time (CET; UTC+01:00). Daylight saving time is observed from the last Sunday in March (02:00 CET) to the last Sunday in October (03:00 CEST).

== History ==
Luxembourg first introduced CET in 1904, but switched to UTC+00:00 in 1918. CET was reintroduced in 1940 under German occupation.

== IANA time zone database ==
In the IANA time zone database, Luxembourg is given one zone in the file zone.tab – Europe/Luxembourg. Data for Luxembourg directly from zone.tab of the IANA time zone database; columns marked with * are the columns from zone.tab itself:

c.c.*	coordinates*	TZ*	Comments	UTC offset	DST
LU	+4936+00609	Europe/Luxembourg		+01:00	+02:00

== See also ==
- Time in Europe
- List of time zones by country
- List of time zones by UTC offset
