= Time in Liechtenstein =

- Time zone: Central European Time
- Initials: CET
- UTC offset: UTC+01:00
- Adopted: 1894

Daylight saving time
- Name: Central European Summer Time
- Initials: CEST
- UTC offset: UTC+02:00
- Start: Last Sunday in March (02:00 CET)
- End: Last Sunday in October (03:00 CEST)
- In use since: 1981

tz database
- Europe/Vaduz

In Liechtenstein, the standard time is Central European Time (CET; UTC+01:00). Daylight saving time is observed from the last Sunday in March (02:00 CET) to the last Sunday in October (03:00 CEST). Liechtenstein adopted CET in 1894.

== History ==
Liechtenstein adopted CET in 1894. Liechtenstein first observed daylight saving time in 1941 and 1942, in-line with Switzerland, and again since 1981.

== IANA time zone database ==
The IANA time zone database in the file zone.tab contains one zone for Liechtenstein: Europe/Vaduz. Data below is for Liechtenstein directly from zone.tab of the IANA time zone database. Columns marked with * are the columns from zone.tab itself:

c.c.*	coordinates*	TZ*	Comments	UTC offset	DST
LI	+4709+00931	Europe/Vaduz		+01:00	+02:00

== See also ==
- Time in Europe
- Time in Switzerland
