= Time in Senegal =

- Time zone: Greenwich Mean Time
- Initials: GMT
- UTC offset: UTC+00:00

Daylight saving time
- DST not observed

tz database
- Africa/Dakar

Time in Senegal is given by a single time zone, denoted as Greenwich Mean Time (GMT; UTC+00:00). Senegal shares this time zone with several other countries, including fourteen in western Africa. Senegal does not observe daylight saving time (DST).

== History ==
Senegal first adopted UTC−01:00 on 1 January 1912.

== IANA time zone database ==
In the IANA time zone database, Senegal is given one zone in the file zone.tab – Africa/Dakar. "SN" refers to the country's ISO 3166-1 alpha-2 country code. Data for Senegal directly from zone.tab of the IANA time zone database; columns marked with * are the columns from zone.tab itself:

| c.c.* | coordinates* | TZ* | Comments | UTC offset | DST |
|---|---|---|---|---|---|
| SN | +1440−01726 | Africa/Dakar | | +00:00 | +00:00 |

== See also ==
- Time in Africa
- List of time zones by country
