= Time in Estonia =

Time zones of Europe. EET (UTC+02:00) and EEST (UTC+03:00) in yellow.

Estonia uses Eastern European Time (EET) (UTC+02:00) during winter, and Eastern European Summer Time (EEST) (UTC+03:00) during summer. Estonia has observed daylight saving time since 1981. However, it was not used from 1989 to 1996 and 2000 to 2002.

Before autumn 1940, Eastern European Time was used in Estonia. After incorporation into the Soviet Union, Moscow Time was imposed. Moscow Time was used until 26 March 1989.
