= Date and time notation =

Date and time notation around the world varies.

An approach to harmonize the different notations is the ISO 8601 standard.

Since the Internet is a main enabler of communication between people with different date notation backgrounds, and software is used to facilitate the communication, RFC standards and a W3C tips and discussion paper were published.

- RFC 822 "Standard for the Format of Arpa Internet Text Messages"
  - published 1982-08-13
  - e.g. used for email
  - format: [day ,] 20 Jun 82 14:01:17
- RFC 2445 "Internet Calendaring and Scheduling Core Object Specification"
  - format: 19960401T235959Z
- RFC 3339 "Date and Time on the Internet: Timestamps"
  - published July 2002
  - intended use: new internet protocols
  - format: 1982-06-20
- W3C: "Use international date format (ISO)"

== See also ==
- Calendar date § Date format
- Date and time representation by country
- Date code
- Holocene calendar
- ISO 8601 usage
- Time formatting and storage bugs
- Unix time
