= Time in Europe =

Time zones in Europe

Time in Europe: Light Blue / Western European Time / Greenwich Mean Time (UTC); Blue / Western European Time / Greenwich Mean Time (UTC); Blue / Western European Summer Time / British Summer Time / Irish Standard Time (UTC+1); Red / Central European Time (UTC+1); Red / Central European Summer Time (UTC+2); Yellow / Eastern European Time / Kaliningrad Time (UTC+2); Ochre / Eastern European Time (UTC+2); Ochre / Eastern European Summer Time (UTC+3); Green / Moscow Time / Turkey Time (UTC+3); Turquoise / Armenia Time / Azerbaijan Time / Georgia Time / Samara Time (UTC+4); Pink / Kazakhstan Time / Yekaterinburg Time (UTC+5); ▉▉▉▉ Pale hues: Standard time observed all year ▉▉▉ Dark hues: Daylight saving time

Europe spans seven primary time zones (from UTC−01:00 to UTC+05:00), excluding summer time offsets (five of them can be seen on the map, with one further-western zone containing the Azores, and one further-eastern zone spanning the Ural regions of Russia and European part of Kazakhstan). Most European countries use summer time and harmonise their summer time adjustments; see Summer time in Europe for details.

The time zones actually in use in Europe differ significantly from uniform zoning based purely on longitude, as used for example under the nautical time system. The world could in theory be divided into 24 time zones, each spanning 15 degrees of longitude. However, due to geographical and cultural factors, it is not practical to divide the world so evenly, and actual time zones may differ significantly from those based purely on longitude. In Europe, the widespread use of Central European Time (CET) causes major variations in some areas from solar time. Based on solar time, CET would range from 7.5 to 22.5°E. However, for example Spain (almost entirely in the Western hemisphere) and France (almost entirely west of 7.5°E, as illustrated in the map below) should theoretically use UTC, as they did before the Second World War. The general result is a solar noon which is much later than clock noon, and later sunrises and sunsets than should theoretically happen. The Benelux countries should also theoretically use GMT.

Russia and Belarus observed "permanent summer time" between March 2011 and October 2014. Since October 2014 Russia has observed "permanent winter time". Iceland can be considered to be on "de facto" permanent summer time because, since 1968, it has used UTC time all year, despite being located more than 15° west of the prime meridian. It should therefore be located in UTC−01:00, but chooses to remain closer to continental European time, resulting in legal times significantly in advance of local solar time; this is of little practical significance owing to the wide variations in daylight hours in that country.

The European Commission proposed in September 2018 ending the observance of summer time in the EU. a move supported by a 2019 vote in the European Parliament.

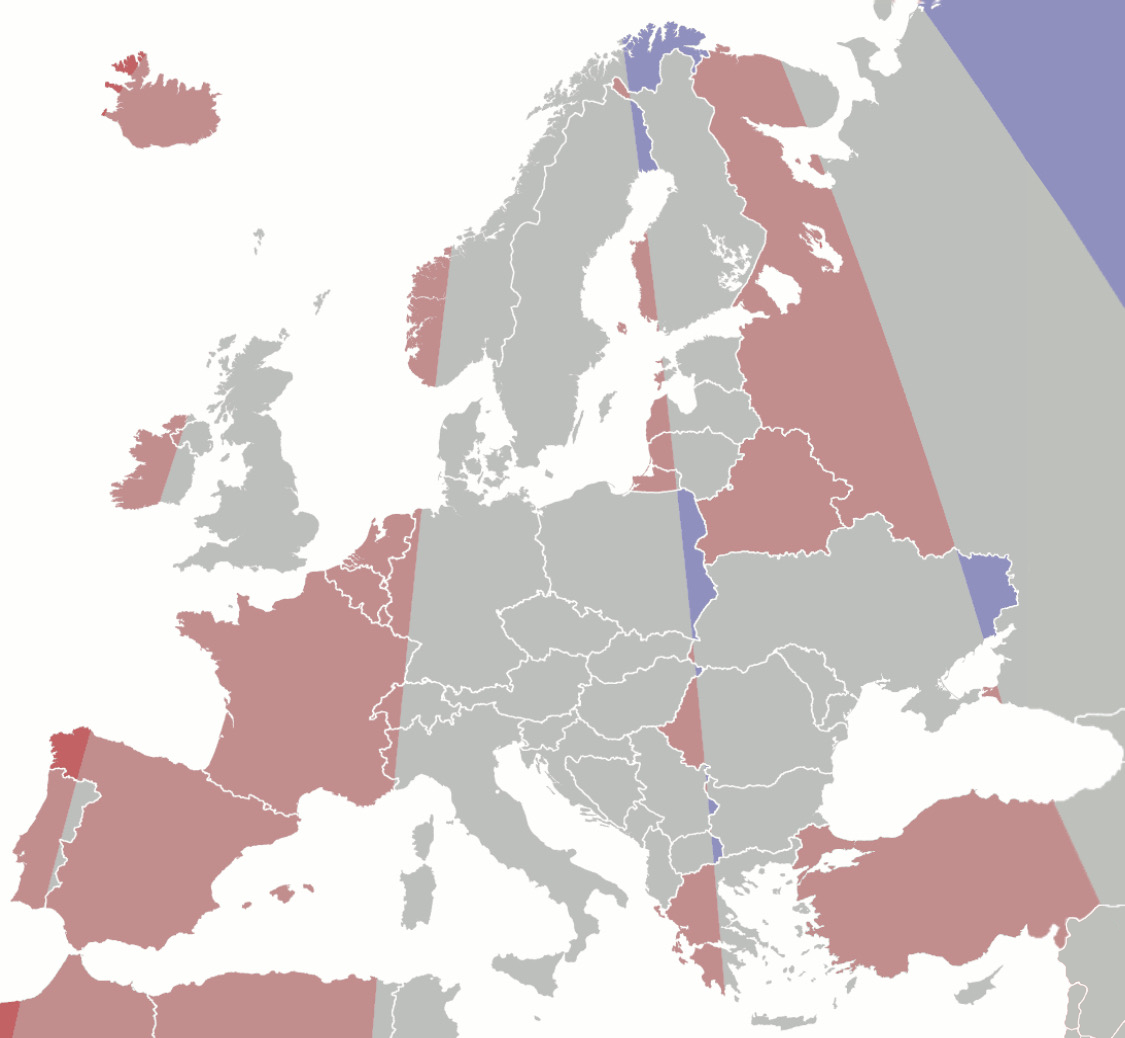
This map shows the difference between legal time and local mean time in Europe during the winter. Most of Western Europe and the western part of European Russia are significantly ahead of local solar time.

Colour	Legal time vs local mean time
	1 h ± 30 m behind
	0 h ± 30 m
	1 h ± 30 m ahead
	2 h ± 30 m ahead

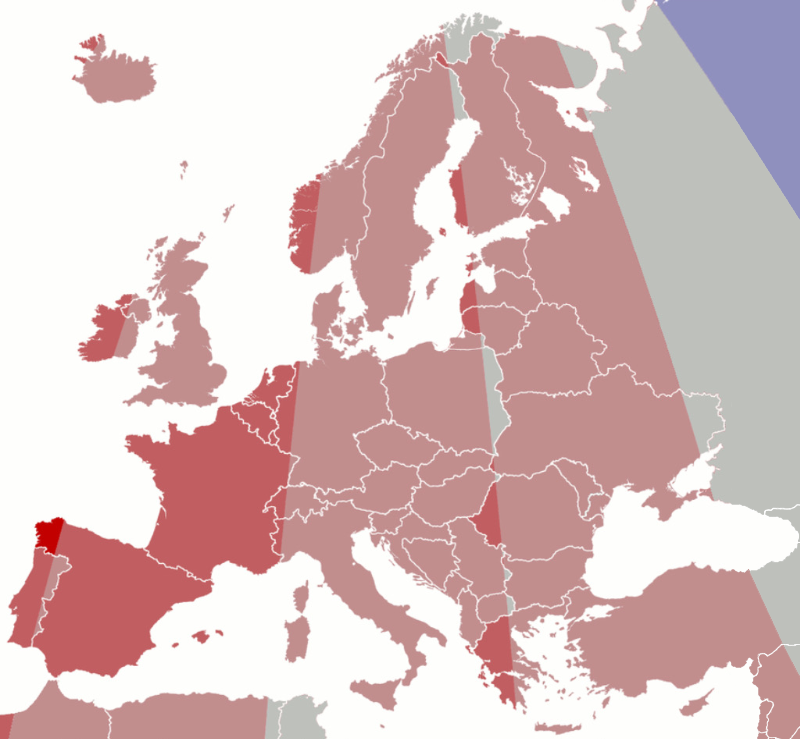
This map shows the difference between legal time and local mean time in Europe during the summer. Most of Western Europe is significantly ahead of local solar time.

Colour	Legal time vs local mean time
	1 h ± 30 m behind
	0 h ± 30 m
	1 h ± 30 m ahead
	2 h ± 30 m ahead
	3 h ± 30 m ahead

== Use ==
Of the 27 EU member states (all use daylight saving time in the summer):

- The Azores (Portugal) observe Azores Time.
- Ireland, Portugal (except Azores), and the Canary Islands (Spain) use Western European Time.
- Austria, Belgium, Croatia, Czech Republic, Denmark, France (except overseas territories), Germany, Hungary, Italy, Luxembourg, Malta, Netherlands, Poland, Slovakia, Slovenia, Spain (except Canary Islands) and Sweden use Central European Time.
- Finland, Estonia, Latvia, Lithuania, Romania, Bulgaria, Greece and Cyprus use Eastern European Time

Of non-EU member states:

- The United Kingdom and the Faroe Islands observe Western European Time with daylight saving time, while Iceland observes it without daylight saving time.
- Norway, Switzerland, Bosnia and Herzegovina, Serbia, Kosovo, North Macedonia, Montenegro, Albania, San Marino, Vatican City, Andorra, Monaco, Liechtenstein, and Gibraltar (a British Overseas Territory) observe Central European Time with daylight saving time.
- Ukraine, Moldova, Transnistria and Northern Cyprus observe Eastern European Time with daylight saving time, while Kaliningrad Oblast observe it without daylight saving time (Kaliningrad Time).
- Belarus, Russia (western part), Ukraine (Crimea), South Ossetia, Abkhazia and Turkey use Further-eastern European Time without daylight saving time in the summer.
- Armenia, Azerbaijan and Georgia use UTC+04:00 without daylight saving time.
- Kazakhstan and Ural regions of Russia (in European part) both use UTC+05:00 without daylight saving time.

The overseas territories of Denmark, France, and Netherlands are mostly located outside Europe and use other time zones.

== List of time zones ==
Time of Day	Common name(s)	UTC	Summer UTC	Users
06:21, 21 April 2026 UTC−01:00 [refresh]	Further-western European Time (FWT) / Azores Time (AZOT)	UTC−1	UTC	Azores (Portugal)
07:21, 21 April 2026 UTC+00:00 [refresh]	Further-western European Summer Time (FWST) / Azores Summer Time (AZOST)	UTC−1	UTC	Azores (Portugal)
07:21, 21 April 2026 UTC+00:00 [refresh]	Western European Time (WET) / Greenwich Mean Time (GMT) / Iceland Time (ICT)	UTC		Iceland
07:21, 21 April 2026 UTC+00:00 [refresh]	Western European Time (WET) / Greenwich Mean Time (GMT)	UTC	UTC+1	Portugal (including Madeira); United Kingdom; Republic of Ireland; Faroe Islands; Canary Islands
08:21, 21 April 2026 UTC+01:00 [refresh]	Western European Summer Time (WEST) ∟ Irish Standard Time (IST) ∟ British Summer Time (BST)	UTC	UTC+1	Portugal (including Madeira); United Kingdom; Republic of Ireland; Faroe Islands; Canary Islands
08:21, 21 April 2026 UTC+01:00 [refresh]	Central European Time (CET)	UTC+1	UTC+2	Most of mainland western Europe; Scandinavia; Central Europe; Central southern Europe; Western Balkans
09:21, 21 April 2026 UTC+02:00 [refresh]	Central European Summer Time (CEST)	UTC+1	UTC+2	Most of mainland western Europe; Scandinavia; Central Europe; Central southern Europe; Western Balkans
09:21, 21 April 2026 UTC+02:00 [refresh]	Eastern European Time (EET) / Kaliningrad Time (KALT)	UTC+2		Kaliningrad Oblast (Russia)
09:21, 21 April 2026 UTC+02:00 [refresh]	Eastern European Time (EET)	UTC+2	UTC+3	Finland; Baltic states; Ukraine; Moldova; Romania; Bulgaria; Greece
10:21, 21 April 2026 UTC+03:00 [refresh]	Eastern European Summer Time (EEST)	UTC+2	UTC+3	Finland; Baltic states; Ukraine; Moldova; Romania; Bulgaria; Greece
10:21, 21 April 2026 UTC+03:00 [refresh]	Further-eastern European Time (FET) ∟ Turkey Time (TRT) ∟ Moscow Standard Time (MSK) ∟ Minsk Time (MINT)	UTC+3		Belarus; Most of western Russia; Turkey; Abkhazia; South Ossetia
11:21, 21 April 2026 UTC+04:00 [refresh]	Armenia Time (AMT) / Georgia Time (GET) / Azerbaijan Time (AZT) / Samara Time (SAMT)	UTC+4		Parts of western Russia; Armenia; Azerbaijan; Georgia
12:21, 21 April 2026 UTC+05:00 [refresh]	Yekaterinburg Time (YEKT)	UTC+5		Western-central Russia; Kazakhstan
