= List of UTC offsets =

This is a list of the UTC time offsets, showing the difference in hours and minutes from Coordinated Universal Time (UTC), from the westernmost (−12:00) to the easternmost (+14:00). It includes countries and regions that observe them during standard time or year-round.

The main purpose of this page is to list the current standard time offsets of different countries, territories and regions. Information on daylight saving time or historical changes in offsets can be found in the individual offset articles (e.g. UTC+01:00) or the country-specific time articles (e.g. Time in Vatican).

Places that observe daylight saving time (DST) during their respective summer periods are listed only once, at the offset for their winter (usually known as "standard") period; see their individual articles for more information. A source for detailed DST and historical information is the tz database. Note that there are many instances of unofficial observation of a different offset (and/or DST) than expected by areas close to borders, usually for economic reasons.

In the section names, the letter after the offset is that used in nautical time, with which the UTC offset section overlaps at least partially. Nautical time strictly partitions the globe at 15 degrees, whereas UTC offsets can deviate, for instance according to borders. If present, a dagger (†) indicates the usage of a nautical time zone letter outside of the standard geographic definition of that time zone.

Some zones that are north/south of each other in the mid-Pacific differ by 24 hours in time – they have the same time of day but dates that are one day apart. The two extreme time zones on Earth (both in the mid-Pacific) differ by 26 hours.

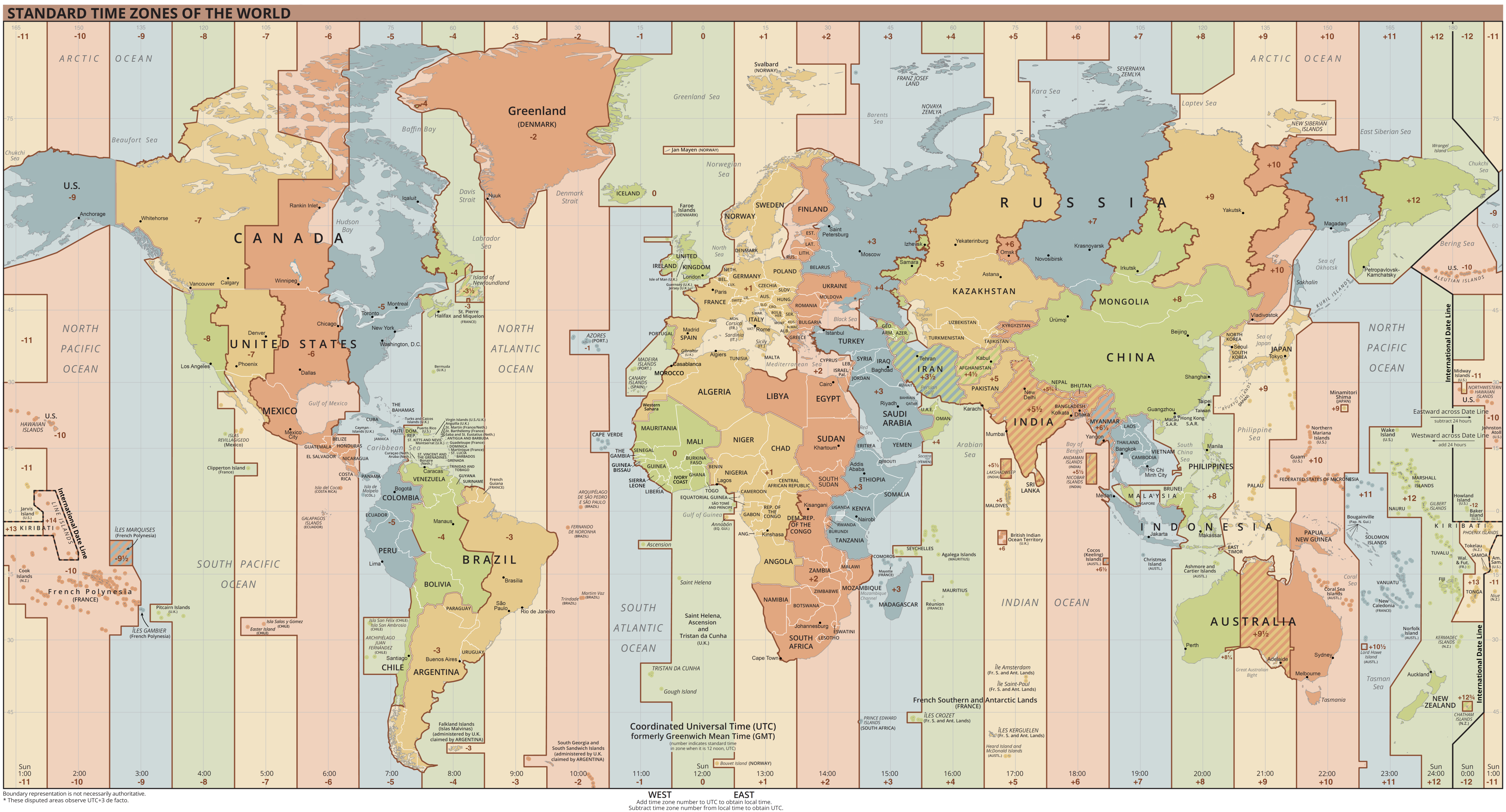
Standard Time Zones, as of March 8, 2026

In the following list, only the rightmost indent of a group of locations is meant to indicate the area observing the offset; the places above and to the left are meant solely to indicate the area's parent administrative divisions. For example, the entry of Eucla explains that Eucla observes the specified time offset, and the state (Western Australia) and country (Australia) are shown only for reference and are not meant to be wholly included as observing that offset.

The purpose of the "principal cities" list at the top of some of the time zone entries is to give a brief list of major cities. These should be limited to a maximum of one city per country (within each zone), and not all countries in a zone need to have a city listed. Similarly, time zones need not have any cities listed if there are no major cities in that offset.

== UTC−12:00, Y ==
- United States
  - United States Minor Outlying Islands
    - Baker Island
    - Howland Island

== UTC−11:00, X ==
- New Zealand
  - Niue
- United States
  - American Samoa
  - United States Minor Outlying Islands
    - Jarvis Island
    - Kingman Reef
    - Midway Atoll
    - Palmyra Atoll

== UTC−10:00, W ==
Principal cities: Honolulu

- France
  - French Polynesia (except Marquesas Islands and Gambier Islands)
- New Zealand
  - Cook Islands
- United States (Hawaii–Aleutian Time Zone)
  - Alaska
    - Aleutian Islands west of 169°30′W
  - Hawaii
  - United States Minor Outlying Islands
    - Johnston Atoll

== UTC−09:30, V† ==
- France
  - French Polynesia
    - Marquesas Islands

== UTC−09:00, V ==
Principal cities: Anchorage

- France
  - French Polynesia
    - Gambier Islands
- United States (Alaska Time Zone)
  - Alaska
    - Except Aleutian Islands west of 169°30′W

== UTC−08:00, U ==
Principal cities: Los Angeles, Vancouver, Tijuana

- Canada (Pacific Time Zone)
  - British Columbia
    - Except Northern Rockies Regional Municipality, Peace River Regional District, and the south-eastern communities of Cranbrook, Golden and Invermere
- France
  - Clipperton Island
- Mexico
  - Baja California
- United Kingdom
  - Pitcairn Islands
- United States (Pacific Time Zone)
  - California
  - Idaho
    - The northern counties of Benewah, Bonner, Boundary, Clearwater, Idaho, Kootenai, Latah, Lewis, Nez Perce and Shoshone
  - Nevada (except West Wendover)
  - Oregon
    - All of the state except Malheur County (but including a small strip in the south of Malheur)
  - Washington

== UTC−07:00, T ==
Principal cities: Denver, Ciudad Juárez

- Canada (Mountain Time Zone)
  - British Columbia
    - Northern Rockies Regional Municipality
    - Peace River Regional District
    - The south-eastern communities of Cranbrook, Golden and Invermere
  - Northwest Territories
  - Nunavut
    - Kitikmeot Region and all land to the west of 102nd meridian west
  - Saskatchewan
    - Lloydminster
  - Yukon
- Mexico
  - Baja California Sur, Chihuahua, Nayarit, Sinaloa and Sonora states
- United States (Mountain Time Zone)
  - Arizona
  - Colorado
  - Idaho
    - Except the northern counties of Benewah, Bonner, Boundary, Clearwater, Idaho, Kootenai, Latah, Lewis, Nez Perce and Shoshone
  - Kansas
    - The western counties of Greeley, Hamilton, Sherman and Wallace
  - Montana
  - Nebraska
    - The western counties of Cherry (western part), Arthur, Banner, Box Butte, Cheyenne, Dawes, Deuel, Garden, Grant, Hooker, Keith, Kimball, Morrill, Perkins, Scotts Bluff, Sheridan, Sioux, Chase and Dundy
  - Nevada
    - West Wendover
  - New Mexico
  - North Dakota
    - The southwestern counties of Adams, Billings, Bowman, Dunn (southern part), Golden Valley, Grant, Hettinger, McKenzie (southern part), Sioux (west of ND Route 31), Slope and Stark
  - Oregon
    - Malheur County (except a small strip in the south)
  - South Dakota
    - The western counties of Butte, Corson, Custer, Dewey, Fall River, Haakon, Harding, Lawrence, Meade, Pennington, Perkins, Shannon, Stanley (western part), Ziebach, Jackson and Bennett
  - Texas
    - The western counties of Culberson (northwestern part), El Paso and Hudspeth
  - Utah
  - Wyoming

== UTC−06:00, S ==
Principal cities: Mexico City, Chicago, Guatemala City, Tegucigalpa, Winnipeg, Calgary, San José, San Salvador

- Belize
- Canada (Central Time Zone)
  - Manitoba
  - Nunavut
    - Area between 85th meridian west and 102nd meridian west, except Southampton Island and adjoining islands, and all of Kitikmeot Region
  - Ontario
    - West of 90° west
  - Saskatchewan
    - Entire province except Lloydminster
  - Alberta (Alberta Time Zone)
- Chile
  - Easter Island
- Costa Rica
- Ecuador
  - Galápagos Islands
- El Salvador
- Guatemala
- Honduras
- Mexico
  - All except Baja California, Baja California Sur, Chihuahua, Nayarit, Quintana Roo, Sinaloa and Sonora
- Nicaragua
- United States (Central Time Zone)
  - Alabama
  - Arkansas
  - Florida
    - The counties of Bay, Calhoun, Escambia, Holmes, Jackson, Okaloosa, Santa Rosa, Walton, and Washington, and northern Gulf County (panhandle)
  - Illinois
  - Indiana
    - Northwestern counties of Jasper, Lake, LaPorte, Newton, Porter and Starke
    - Southwestern counties of Gibson, Perry, Posey, Spencer, Vanderburgh and Warrick
  - Iowa
  - Kansas
    - Entire state except Greeley, Hamilton, Sherman and Wallace counties
  - Kentucky
    - The counties of Breckinridge, Grayson, Hart, Green, Adair, Russell and Clinton, and all counties to the west of these
  - Louisiana
  - Michigan
    - The western counties of Dickinson, Gogebic, Iron and Menominee
  - Minnesota
  - Mississippi
  - Missouri
  - Nebraska
    - Except western counties of Cherry (western part), Hooker, Arthur, Banner, Box Butte, Cheyenne, Dawes, Deuel, Garden, Grant, Hooker, Keith, Kimball, Morrill, Perkins, Scotts Bluff, Sheridan, Sioux, Chase and Dundy
  - North Dakota
    - Entire state except southwest
  - Oklahoma
  - South Dakota
    - Except the western counties of Butte, Corson, Custer, Dewey, Fall River, Haakon, Harding, Lawrence, Meade, Pennington, Perkins, Shannon, Stanley (western part), Ziebach, Jackson and Bennett
  - Tennessee
    - Counties located to the west of the counties of Scott, Morgan, Roane, Rhea, and Hamilton
  - Texas
    - Excluding the western counties of Culberson (northwestern part), El Paso and Hudspeth
  - Wisconsin

== UTC−05:00, R ==
Principal cities: New York City, Toronto, Havana, Lima, Bogotá, Kingston, Quito

- Bahamas
- Brazil
  - Acre
  - Amazonas (13 western municipalities, approximately marked by a line between Tabatinga and Porto Acre)
- Canada (Eastern Time Zone)
  - Nunavut
    - East of 85th meridian west, and Southampton Island and adjoining islands
  - Ontario
    - East of 90° West
  - Quebec
    - Most of province except easternmost area
- Colombia
- Cuba
- Ecuador (except Galápagos Islands)
- Haiti
- Jamaica
- Mexico
  - Quintana Roo
- Panama
- Peru
- United Kingdom
  - Cayman Islands
  - Turks and Caicos Islands
- United States (Eastern Time Zone)
  - Delaware
  - District of Columbia
  - Florida
    - Entire state except the counties of Bay, Calhoun, Escambia, Holmes, Jackson, Okaloosa, Santa Rosa, Walton, and Washington, and northern Gulf county (panhandle)
  - Georgia
  - Indiana
    - Except the northwestern counties of Jasper, Lake, LaPorte, Newton, Porter and Starke, and the southwestern counties of Gibson, Perry, Posey, Spencer, Vanderburgh and Warrick
  - Kentucky
    - Counties located to the east of the counties of Breckinridge, Grayson, Hart, Green, Adair, Russell and Clinton
  - Maryland
  - Michigan
    - Except the western counties of Dickinson, Gogebic, Iron and Menominee
  - New England (states of Connecticut, Massachusetts, Maine, New Hampshire, Rhode Island and Vermont)
  - New Jersey
  - New York
  - North Carolina
  - Ohio
  - Pennsylvania
  - South Carolina
  - Tennessee
    - The counties of Scott, Morgan, Roane, Rhea, Meigs and Bradley, and all counties to the east of these
  - Virginia
  - West Virginia
  - United States Minor Outlying Islands
    - Navassa Island

== UTC−04:00, Q ==
Principal cities: Santiago, Santo Domingo, Manaus, Caracas, La Paz, Halifax

- Antigua and Barbuda
- Barbados
- Bolivia
- Brazil
  - The states of Amazonas (except westernmost municipalities), Mato Grosso, Mato Grosso do Sul, Rondônia and Roraima
- Canada (Atlantic Time Zone)
  - New Brunswick
  - Newfoundland and Labrador
    - Labrador (except the area between L'Anse-au-Clair and Norman’s Bay)
  - Nova Scotia
  - Prince Edward Island
  - Quebec
    - East of the 63°W longitude
- Chile (except Easter Island and Magallanes/Antarctic)
- Denmark
  - Greenland
    - Pituffik
- Dominica
- Dominican Republic
- France
  - Guadeloupe
  - Martinique
  - Saint Barthélemy
  - Saint Martin
- Grenada
- Guyana
- Netherlands
  - Aruba
  - Curaçao
  - Netherlands
    - Bonaire
    - Saba
    - Sint Eustatius
  - Sint Maarten
- Saint Kitts and Nevis
- Saint Lucia
- Saint Vincent and the Grenadines
- Trinidad and Tobago
- United Kingdom
  - Anguilla
  - Bermuda
  - British Virgin Islands
  - Montserrat
- United States (Atlantic Time Zone)
  - Puerto Rico
  - U.S. Virgin Islands
- Venezuela

== UTC−03:30, P† ==
Principal cities: St. John's

- Canada (Newfoundland Time Zone)
  - Newfoundland and Labrador
    - Labrador
      - The area between L'Anse-au-Clair and Norman's Bay
    - Newfoundland

== UTC−03:00, P ==
Principal cities: São Paulo, Buenos Aires, Montevideo

- Argentina
- Brazil
  - Except the western states of Acre, Amazonas, Mato Grosso, Mato Grosso do Sul, Rondônia and Roraima; and offshore islands
- Chile
  - Magallanes/Antarctic
- France
  - French Guiana
  - Saint Pierre and Miquelon
- Paraguay
- Suriname
- United Kingdom
  - Falkland Islands
- Uruguay

== UTC−02:00, O ==
- Brazil
  - Fernando de Noronha
- Denmark
  - Greenland
    - Except areas around Danmarkshavn and Pituffik
- United Kingdom
  - South Georgia and the South Sandwich Islands

== UTC−01:00, N ==
- Cape Verde
- Portugal
  - Azores

== UTC+00:00, Z ==
Principal cities: London, Dublin, Lisbon, Abidjan, Accra, Dakar

- Burkina Faso
- Côte d'Ivoire
- Denmark
  - Faroe Islands
  - Greenland
    - Danmarkshavn
- Gambia
- Ghana
- Guinea
- Guinea-Bissau
- Iceland
- Ireland
- Liberia
- Mali
- Mauritania
- Portugal (Including Madeira and excluding Azores islands)
- São Tomé and Príncipe
- Spain
  - Canary Islands
- Senegal
- Sierra Leone
- Togo
- United Kingdom (Including Guernsey, Isle of Man, Jersey and Saint Helena, Ascension and Tristan da Cunha)

== UTC+01:00, A ==
Principal cities: Paris, Berlin, Rome, Stockholm, Madrid, Warsaw, Lagos, Kinshasa, Algiers, Casablanca

- Albania
- Algeria
- Andorra
- Angola
- Austria
- Belgium
- Benin
- Bosnia and Herzegovina
- Cameroon
- Central African Republic
- Chad
- Congo-Brazzaville
- Democratic Republic of the Congo
  - Western area, including Kinshasa
- Croatia
- Czech Republic
- Denmark
- Equatorial Guinea
- France (Metropolitan)
- Gabon
- Germany
- Hungary
- Italy
- Kosovo
- Liechtenstein
- Luxembourg
- Malta
- Monaco
- Montenegro
- Morocco
- Netherlands
- Niger
- Nigeria
- North Macedonia
- Norway (including Svalbard and Jan Mayen)
- Poland
- San Marino
- Serbia
- Slovakia
- Slovenia
- Spain (including Balearic Islands, Ceuta and Melilla and excluding Canary Islands)
- Sweden
- Switzerland
- Tunisia
- United Kingdom
  - Gibraltar
- Vatican City
- Western Sahara

== UTC+02:00, B ==
Principal cities: Athens, Bucharest, Cairo, Helsinki, Jerusalem, Johannesburg, Khartoum, Kyiv, Riga, Sofia, Chișinău

- Botswana
- Bulgaria
- Burundi
- Cyprus (including Northern Cyprus)
- Democratic Republic of the Congo
  - Eastern area, including Lubumbashi and Mbuji-Mayi
- Egypt
- Estonia
- Eswatini
- Finland
- Greece
- Israel
- Latvia
- Lebanon
- Lesotho
- Lithuania
- Libya
- Malawi
- Moldova (including Transnistria)
- Mozambique
- Namibia
- Gaza, West Bank
- Romania
- Russia
  - Northwestern Federal District
    - Kaliningrad Oblast
- Rwanda
- South Africa (except Prince Edward Islands)
- South Sudan
- Sudan
- Ukraine
  - Except Crimea (occupied by Russia), part of Donetsk and Luhansk regions
- United Kingdom
  - Akrotiri and Dhekelia
- Zambia
- Zimbabwe

== UTC+03:00, C ==
Principal cities: Moscow, Istanbul, Riyadh, Baghdad, Addis Ababa, Doha, Nairobi, Kuwait City

- Bahrain
- Belarus
- Comoros
- Djibouti
- Eritrea
- Ethiopia
- France
  - French Southern and Antarctic Lands
    - Scattered Islands in the Indian Ocean
  - Mayotte
- Georgia
  - Abkhazia and South Ossetia (two self-proclaimed republics with limited recognition)
- Iraq
- Jordan
- Kenya
- Kuwait
- Madagascar
- Qatar
- Russia – Moscow Time
  - Central Federal District
  - North Caucasian Federal District
  - Northwestern Federal District
    - Except Kaliningrad Oblast
  - Southern Federal District
    - Except Astrakhan Oblast
  - Volga Federal District
    - Except Samara Oblast, Saratov Oblast, Udmurtia, Ulyanovsk Oblast, Bashkortostan, Orenburg Oblast and Perm Krai
- Saudi Arabia
- Somalia
- South Africa
  - Prince Edward Islands
- Syria
- Tanzania
- Turkey
- Uganda
- Ukraine
  - Crimea (since the 2014 Russian annexation of Crimea fully controlled by Russia), part of Donetsk and Luhansk regions (the self-proclaimed Donetsk People's Republic and Luhansk People's Republic)
- Yemen

== UTC+03:30, C† ==
Principal cities: Tehran

- Iran

== UTC+04:00, D ==
Principal cities: Dubai, Tbilisi, Yerevan, Baku, Samara

- Armenia
- Azerbaijan
- France
  - French Southern and Antarctic Lands
    - Crozet Islands
  - Réunion
- Georgia
  - Except Abkhazia and South Ossetia
- Mauritius
- Oman
- Russia – Samara Time
  - Southern Federal District
    - Astrakhan Oblast
  - Volga Federal District
    - Samara Oblast, Saratov Oblast, Udmurtia and Ulyanovsk Oblast
- Seychelles
- United Arab Emirates

== UTC+04:30, D† ==
Principal cities: Kabul

- Afghanistan

== UTC+05:00, E ==
Principal cities: Karachi, Astana, Tashkent, Yekaterinburg

- Australia
  - Heard Island and McDonald Islands
- France
  - French Southern and Antarctic Lands
    - Île Amsterdam
    - Île Saint-Paul
    - Kerguelen Islands
- Kazakhstan
- Maldives
- Pakistan
- Russia – Yekaterinburg Time
  - Ural Federal District
  - Volga Federal District
    - Bashkortostan, Orenburg Oblast and Perm Krai
- Tajikistan
- Turkmenistan
- Uzbekistan

== UTC+05:30, E† ==
Principal cities: Delhi, Mumbai, Colombo

- India
- Sri Lanka

== UTC+05:45, E* ==
Principal cities: Kathmandu

- Nepal

== UTC+06:00, F ==
Principal cities: Dhaka, Bishkek, Omsk

- Bangladesh
- Bhutan
- Kyrgyzstan
- Russia – Omsk Time
  - Siberian Federal District
    - Omsk Oblast
- United Kingdom
  - British Indian Ocean Territory

== UTC+06:30, F† ==
Principal cities: Yangon

- Myanmar
- Australia
  - Cocos (Keeling) Islands

== UTC+07:00, G ==
Principal cities: Bangkok, Jakarta, Ho Chi Minh City, Krasnoyarsk

- Australia
  - Christmas Island
- Cambodia
- Indonesia
  - Western Indonesian Time (WIB): Central Kalimantan, West Kalimantan, Java, and Sumatra
- Laos
- Mongolia
  - Western part, including Hovd
- Russia – Krasnoyarsk Time
  - Siberian Federal District
    - Altai Krai
    - Altai Republic
    - Kemerovo Oblast
    - Khakassia
    - Krasnoyarsk Krai
    - Novosibirsk Oblast
    - Tomsk Oblast
    - Tuva
- Thailand
- Vietnam

== UTC+08:00, H ==
Principal cities: Shanghai, Taipei, Kuala Lumpur, Singapore, Perth, Manila, Makassar, Irkutsk, Denpasar

- Australia
  - Western Australia (except Eucla)
- Brunei
- China
- Hong Kong
- Indonesia
  - Central Indonesian Time (WITA): East Kalimantan, North Kalimantan, South Kalimantan, Sulawesi, and Lesser Sunda Islands
- Macau
- Malaysia
- Mongolia
  - Eastern part, including Ulaanbaatar
- Philippines
- Russia – Irkutsk Time
  - Far Eastern Federal District
    - Buryatia
  - Siberian Federal District
    - Irkutsk Oblast
- Singapore
- Taiwan

== UTC+08:45, H* ==
- Australia
  - Western Australia
    - Eucla

== UTC+09:00, I ==
Principal cities: Tokyo, Seoul, Pyongyang, Jayapura, Chita

- East Timor
- Indonesia
  - Eastern Indonesian Time (WIT): Maluku Islands, Papua, West Papua, Central Papua, Highland Papua, South Papua, and Southwest Papua
- Japan
- North Korea
- Palau
- Russia
  - Far Eastern Federal District
    - Amur Oblast, Sakha Republic (western part; west of the Lena River as well as territories adjacent to the Lena on the eastern side), Zabaykalsky Krai
- South Korea

== UTC+09:30, I† ==
Principal cities: Adelaide

- Australia
  - New South Wales
    - Broken Hill
  - Northern Territory
  - South Australia

== UTC+10:00, K ==
Principal cities: Melbourne, Port Moresby, Vladivostok

- Australia
  - Australian Capital Territory
  - New South Wales (except Broken Hill)
  - Queensland
  - Tasmania
  - Victoria
- Federated States of Micronesia
  - Western part
- Papua New Guinea
  - All of the country except Autonomous Region of Bougainville
- Russia – Vladivostok Time
  - Far Eastern Federal District
    - Jewish Autonomous Oblast, Khabarovsk Krai, Primorsky Krai and Sakha Republic (central part; east of 140 degrees longitude and including the Abyysky, Allaikhovsky, Momsky, Nizhnekolymsky, and Srednekolymsky districts)
- United States
  - Guam
  - Northern Mariana Islands

== UTC+10:30, K† ==
- Australia
  - New South Wales
    - Lord Howe Island

== UTC+11:00, L ==
Principal cities: Nouméa

- Australia
  - Norfolk Island
- Federated States of Micronesia
  - Eastern part
- France
  - New Caledonia
- Papua New Guinea
  - Autonomous Region of Bougainville
- Russia – Magadan Time
  - Far Eastern Federal District
    - Magadan Oblast, Sakhalin Oblast and Sakha Republic (eastern part: Oymyakonsky, Ust-Yansky, and Verkhoyansky districts)
- Solomon Islands
- Vanuatu

== UTC+12:00, M ==
Principal cities: Auckland, Suva, Petropavlovsk-Kamchatsky

- France
  - Wallis and Futuna
- Fiji
- Kiribati
  - Gilbert Islands
- Marshall Islands
- Nauru
- New Zealand (except Chatham Islands)
- Russia – Kamchatka Time
  - Far Eastern Federal District
    - Chukotka Autonomous Okrug and Kamchatka Krai
- Tuvalu
- United States
  - United States Minor Outlying Islands
    - Wake Island

== UTC+12:45, M* ==
- New Zealand
  - Chatham Islands

== UTC+13:00, M† ==
- Kiribati
  - Phoenix Islands
- New Zealand
  - Tokelau
- Samoa
- Tonga

== UTC+14:00, M†† ==
- Kiribati
  - Line Islands

== See also ==
- 180th meridian
- List of military time zones
- List of time zones by country
- List of time zone abbreviations
- List of tz database time zones
- Time zone
- Time zone abolition
