= UTC offset =

Difference between UTC and local standard time

The UTC offset is the difference in hours and minutes between Coordinated Universal Time (UTC) and the standard time at a particular place. This difference is expressed with respect to UTC and is generally shown in the format ±[hh]:[mm], ±[hh][mm], or ±[hh]. So if the time being described is two hours ahead of UTC (such as in Kigali, Rwanda [approximately 30° E]), the UTC offset would be "+02:00", "+0200", or simply "+02".

By convention, every inhabited place in the world has a UTC offset that is a multiple of 15 minutes but the majority of offsets are stated in whole hours. There are many cases where the national standard time uses a UTC offset that is not defined solely by longitude. (Note: For example, Iceland (capital Reykjavík, 22° W): the "UTC offset defined solely by its longitude" is UTC−02:00, but the national standard time uses an offset (+00:00) that differs from it.)

== Time zones and time offsets ==
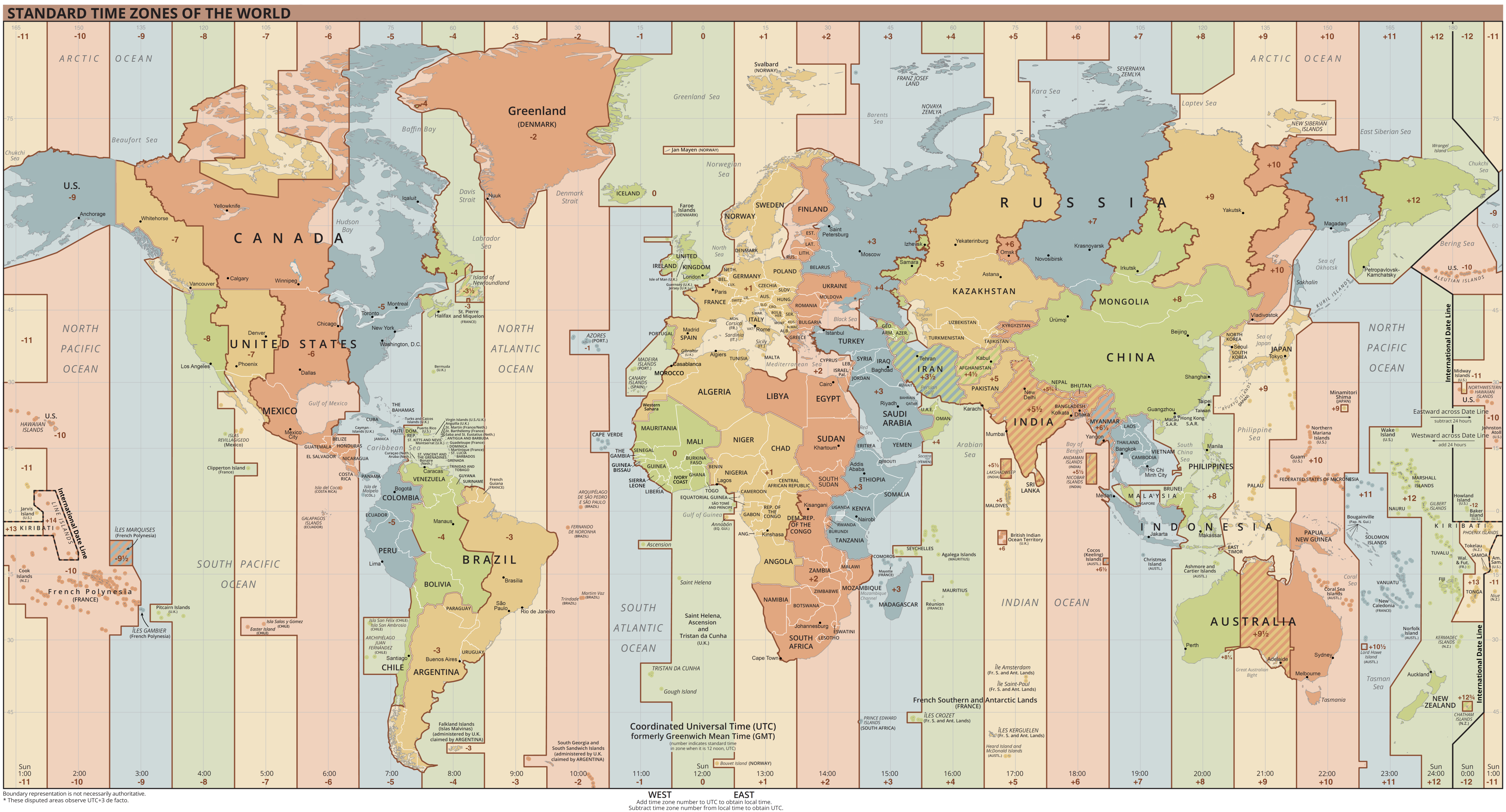
World map of current time zones

A time zone is a geographical region in which residents observe the same standard time. Although nominally a new time zone is established every 15 degrees east or west of the prime meridian (meaning a one-hour change in the time), in practice local geographical or political considerations may vary its application. The most extreme example of this is time in China, which applies a single standard time offset of UTC+08:00 (eight hours ahead of Coordinated Universal Time), even though China spans five geographical time zones.

The UTC offset (or time offset) is an amount of time added to Coordinated Universal Time (UTC) time to specify the time at a given location.

=== Daylight saving time ===
Several regions of the world use daylight saving time (DST) and the UTC offset during this season is typically obtained by adding one hour to local standard time. Central European Time UTC+01:00 is replaced by Central European Summer Time UTC+02:00, and Pacific Standard Time UTC−08:00 is replaced by Pacific Daylight Time UTC−07:00.

== Illustrative examples ==
Examples of the difference between local standard time and UTC
Location	Longitude	UTC offset	When UTC time is 12:00, local time is:	When local time is 12:00, UTC time is:
Accra, Ghana	0° 12′ W	UTC+00:00	12:00	12:00
Mogadishu, Somalia	45° 20′ E	UTC+03:00	15:00	09:00
Dhaka, Bangladesh	90° 23′ E	UTC+06:00	18:00	06:00
Koror, Palau	134° 29′ E	UTC+09:00	21:00	03:00
Suva, Fiji	178° 27′ E	UTC+12:00	00:00	00:00
Honolulu, United States	157° 51′ W	UTC−10:00	02:00	22:00
Guatemala City, Guatemala	90° 32′ W	UTC−06:00	06:00	18:00
Brasília, Brazil	47° 53′ W	UTC−03:00	09:00	15:00

== See also ==
- ISO 8601 – international standard for representing dates and times.
