= Time in Finland =

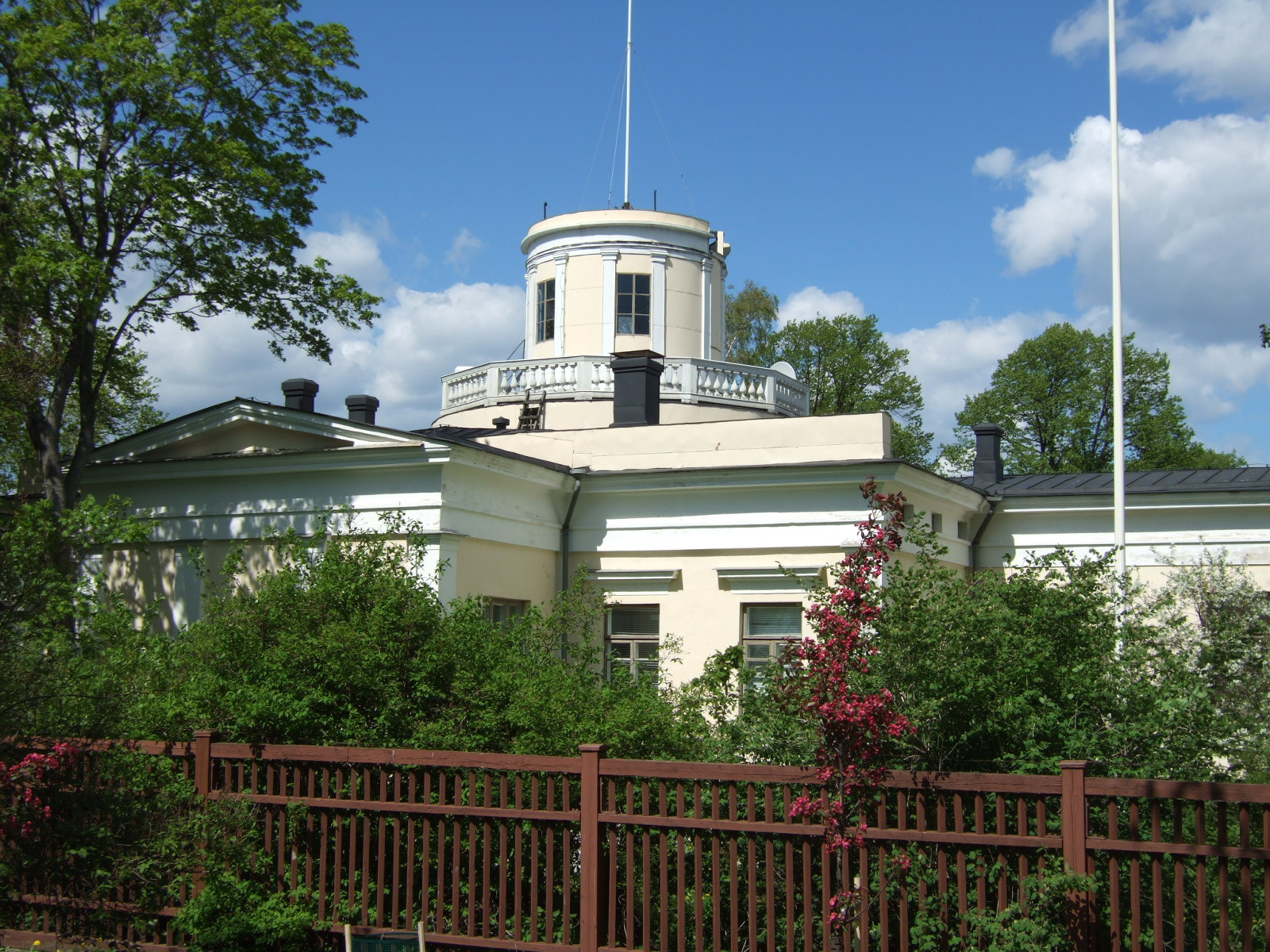
- The Helsinki University Observatory, where Finland's local mean time was measured
- Time zone: Eastern European Time
- Initials: EET
- UTC offset: UTC+02:00
- Standard meridian: 30th meridian east
- Time notation: 24-hour clock
- Adopted: 30 April 1921

Daylight saving time
- Name: Eastern European Summer Time
- Initials: EEST
- UTC offset: UTC+03:00
- Start: 3:00 am EET on the last Sunday in March
- End: 4:00 am EET on the last Sunday in October
- In use since: 1981 (current alignment)

tz database
- Europe/Helsinki; Europe/Mariehamn

Time in Europe: Light Blue / Western European Time / Greenwich Mean Time (UTC); Blue / Western European Time / Greenwich Mean Time (UTC); Blue / Western European Summer Time / British Summer Time / Irish Standard Time (UTC+1); Red / Central European Time (UTC+1); Red / Central European Summer Time (UTC+2); Yellow / Eastern European Time / Kaliningrad Time (UTC+2); Ochre / Eastern European Time (UTC+2); Ochre / Eastern European Summer Time (UTC+3); Green / Moscow Time / Turkey Time (UTC+3); Turquoise / Armenia Time / Azerbaijan Time / Georgia Time / Samara Time (UTC+4); ▉▉▉▉ Pale hues: Standard time observed all year ▉▉▉ Dark hues: Daylight saving time

Finland uses Eastern European Time (Note: Finnish: Itä-Euroopan aika; Swedish: Östeuropeisk tid.) (EET) during the winter as standard time and Eastern European Summer Time (Note: Finnish: Itä-Euroopan kesäaika; Swedish: Östeuropeisk sommartid.) (EEST) during the summer as daylight saving time. EET is two hours ahead of coordinated universal time (UTC+02:00) and EEST is three hours ahead of coordinated universal time (UTC+03:00). Finland adopted EET on 30 April 1921, and has observed daylight saving time in its current alignment since 1981 by advancing the clock forward one hour at 3:00 am EET on the last Sunday in March and back at 4:00 am EET on the last Sunday in October, doing so an hour earlier for the first two years.

Before the 19th century, each locality followed its own solar time, which meant the time between the western and easternmost localities of Finland differed by thirty minutes. In the 19th century, a single time zone across Finland was needed to coordinate scheduling for the newly invented railway and telegraph. In 1862, the mean time 1:39:49.2 ahead of UT was adopted for the railway. Two separate, unsuccessful proposals for a standard time zone were made by the Diet of Finland in 1888 and 1897, when Finland was an autonomous duchy of the Russian Empire. On 30 April 1921, the newly independent government officially adopted the time zone UTC+02:00, known as Eastern European Time. Daylight saving time was first attempted in 1942, but abandoned as not useful. It was introduced again in 1981, so that Finland's time zone could always be aligned with neighbouring countries. In 2017, the Finnish parliament voted in favour of proposals calling on the European Union to consider abolishing daylight saving time.

Finland's time zone is maintained by the VTT Technical Research Centre of Finland and the Centre for Metrology and Accreditation. Using atomic clocks, they make sure the official timekeeping devices in Finland do not fall behind. Finland's high latitude means that in summer the nights are short, and daylight saving time has no impact on the population. Northernmost Finland is within the Arctic Circle and has a polar night lasting 51 days and a polar day lasting 73 days, whilst the southernmost localities of Finland experience less than six hours of daylight in winter and an average of 20 hours of daylight in summer. The country uses the 24 hour clock notation.

== History ==
Before the 19th century, there was no need for a single time zone across Finland, and each locality followed its own solar time. This meant that if it was 12:00 in Helsinki, the local times in other localities would range from 11:40.02 in Mariehamn, Åland, to 12:10.53 in Kuopio, North Savo. The railway required more precise timetables than earlier means of transport, such as sailing ships and stage-coaches. The telegraph, which allowed near real-time communication, also made it inconvenient for each location to observe its own solar time.

The first railway line in Finland (the Hämeenlinna–Helsinki railway) was inaugurated in 1862. Its timetables were noted in a common mean time, measured at the Helsinki University Observatory from the mean time of UTC+01:39:49.2, (Note: Measured at 60°09′42″N 024°57′18″E.) known as "Helsinki time". A ball was released at noon and its falling was noted optically at the railway station and the clock adjusted accordingly. If it was raining, which would prevent the ball from being seen from that far away, noon would additionally be announced by a shot from a cannon. The correct time was relayed to the other stations via electrical telegraph, which had been introduced in Finland in 1854. On the Riihimäki–Saint Petersburg railway, inaugurated in 1870, Helsinki time was used as far as Kaipiainen, just east of Kouvola. In 1882, clock synchronisations to Helsinki time by telephone were arranged between the Finnish Meteorological Institute and Sweden's National Meteorological Institute in order to conveniently conduct geomagnetic measurements.

The International Meridian Conference held in Washington, D.C., in October 1884 divided the world into 24 meridians, each one covering 15 degrees of longitude. Each meridian had an hourly offset from Greenwich Mean Time in the United Kingdom (which was agreed to be the prime meridian at the conference), ranging from GMT−12:00 to the west to GMT+12:00 to the east. (Note: Coordinated Universal Time (UTC) has since replaced Greenwich Mean Time (GMT) as the world time standard.) However this was not immediately implemented in most countries, including Finland. In October 1893, most of the railways in Europe adopted the offsets GMT (also named Western European Time), GMT+01:00 (Middle European Time or Central European Time) and GMT+02:00 (Eastern European Time). The implementation of this was overseen by the American Railway Association. Between 1893 and 1895, several countries in Europe adopted standard times that corresponded with one of these three time zones, but Finland did not.

In 1888, the Diet of Finland asked Emperor Alexander III of Russia (Finland was at this time an autonomous part of the Russian Empire) for Helsinki time to be established as standard throughout Finland. Alexander thought it was enough that the railways had their standard time. A second motion for a standard time was proposed by the government in 1897, now proposing to adopt Eastern European Time as the nearest standard time to Helsinki time. However it was again without success, as the Diet thought that switching to the proposed GMT+02:00 would be met with protest from the railways which used Helsinki time, and subsequently result in there simultaneously being two time zones in use. Nevertheless, as the range of telecommunications increased, Helsinki time spread to common usage throughout the country as it made communications more convenient. Finland became independent in 1917, and in late 1919 the Geographical Society of Finland wrote a proposal to the government that Finland adopt Eastern European Time. The government agreed, and on 12 March 1920 the Minister of Justice decreed that from 1 May 1921 the standard time of Finland would be Eastern European Time. On 30 April 1921 at midnight on Walpurgis Night, the official time was advanced 20 minutes and 10.9 seconds to Eastern European Time, to become the standard time zone for the country. The time change went smoothly, and no major objections were made by Finns. The railways easily adapted to the change.

=== 1929 proposal to adopt Central European Time ===
Between the late 1920s and mid-1930s, development of railway and telegraph connections increased communication between Finland and its western neighbours. Finland's observance of Eastern European Time, while other countries to the west used Central European Time at GMT+01:00, caused difficulties for some businesses, such as differentiating office hours which resulted in inconveniences when making telephone connections. In June 1929, the Finnish Post and Telegraph Board proposed to the Finnish government that Finland's standard time be switched to Central European Time. The proposal failed to gain support, as the Ostrobothnia Chamber of Commerce released a statement in September arguing that Finnish companies were adequately adapting to the two time zones.

The possible time zone change was discussed at the European Timetable Conference in Stockholm in October 1937, where the representatives of Finland, alongside Estonia and Latvia, agreed to present the proposal for the transition to Central European Time to their respective governments. Initial reactions by Finns to the proposal were positive, but the proposal was scrapped after the Finnish Medical Society Duodecim argued that it would misalign biological time and lead to detrimental health effects. The Finnish Post and Telegraph Board also withdrew its original 1929 proposal, and the Ministry of Transport rejected the proposal.

=== Introduction of daylight saving time ===
Daylight saving time was first attempted on 2 April 1942, after the Finnish Medical Society Duodecim claimed that observing daylight saving time would provide economic benefits (the later light in the evenings means less energy consumption) and limit food consumption. The clock moved forward one hour at 24:00 and back again on 4 October at 01:00, but the government did not find daylight saving time useful and its observation was abandoned. In 1980, the other Nordic countries introduced daylight saving time, in line with the directive from the European Economic Community, as did the Soviet Union in 1981. In order to avoid the disturbance of changing time differences with the rest of Europe, daylight saving time was introduced again in Finland in 1981, which was observed from 02:00 EET the last Sunday in March to 03:00 EET on the last Sunday in October, following the same schedule as the other Nordic countries and the Soviet Union so that their time zones could always be aligned. Since 1983, the change has been made an hour later. When Finland joined the European Union (successor to the European Economic Community) in 1995, it continued to observe daylight saving time in line with said directive and is now bound by European Union law to follow it. The current government regulation stipulating that the European Union directive be followed came into effect in 2001.

== Daylight saving time ==
Finland observes daylight saving time by advancing the clock forward one hour from Eastern European Time in UTC+02:00 to Eastern European Summer Time in UTC+03:00 at 03:00 EET on the last Sunday in March and back at 04:00 EET on the last Sunday in October. Finland has observed daylight saving time since 1981. Finland's high latitude means that in summer the nights are short (in Helsinki in July, there are only five hours between sunset and sunrise), and daylight saving time has no impact on the population. In spring and autumn it does (with Helsinki experiencing between 13 and 18 hours of sunlight in spring and 11 to 6 hours in autumn), in addition to the advantage of keeping the time coordinated with other countries.

=== Proposals to end daylight saving time ===
In 2017, the Finnish parliament voted in favour of proposals calling on the European Union to consider abolishing daylight saving time, and a citizen's petition that same year asking the state to give up the practice received 70,000 signatures. At the time, the European Commission was reviewing it. On 8 February 2018, the European Parliament voted to ask the European Commission to re-evaluate daylight saving time in Europe, and on 12 September 2018 the European Commission decided to propose an end to daylight saving time, which would thus repeal Directive 2000/84/EC. In order for this to take effect, both the Council of the European Union and the European Parliament were required to approve the proposal. On 4 March 2019, the European Parliament Transport and Tourism Committee approved the commission's proposal, with a start date planned to be postponed until 2021 at the earliest in order to ensure a smooth transition. This decision was later confirmed by the European Parliament on 26 March.

As of March 2022, the approval from the Council of the European Union had yet to be obtained as the European Union was preoccupied with the COVID-19 pandemic. If the practice were to end, it is not known whether or not Finland would decide to remain on permanent winter time (UTC+02:00) or permanent summer time (UTC+03:00). Yle, Finland's national broadcasting company, has stated that the government would first gather expert opinions and consult the public before implementing changes. A 2018 survey conducted by the Ministry of Justice, which received over 120,000 responses within its first 24 hours, revealed a small majority were in favour of observing permanent winter time over permanent summer time, and a 2019 petition to observe permanent summer time received 50,000 signatures.

== Geography and solar time ==
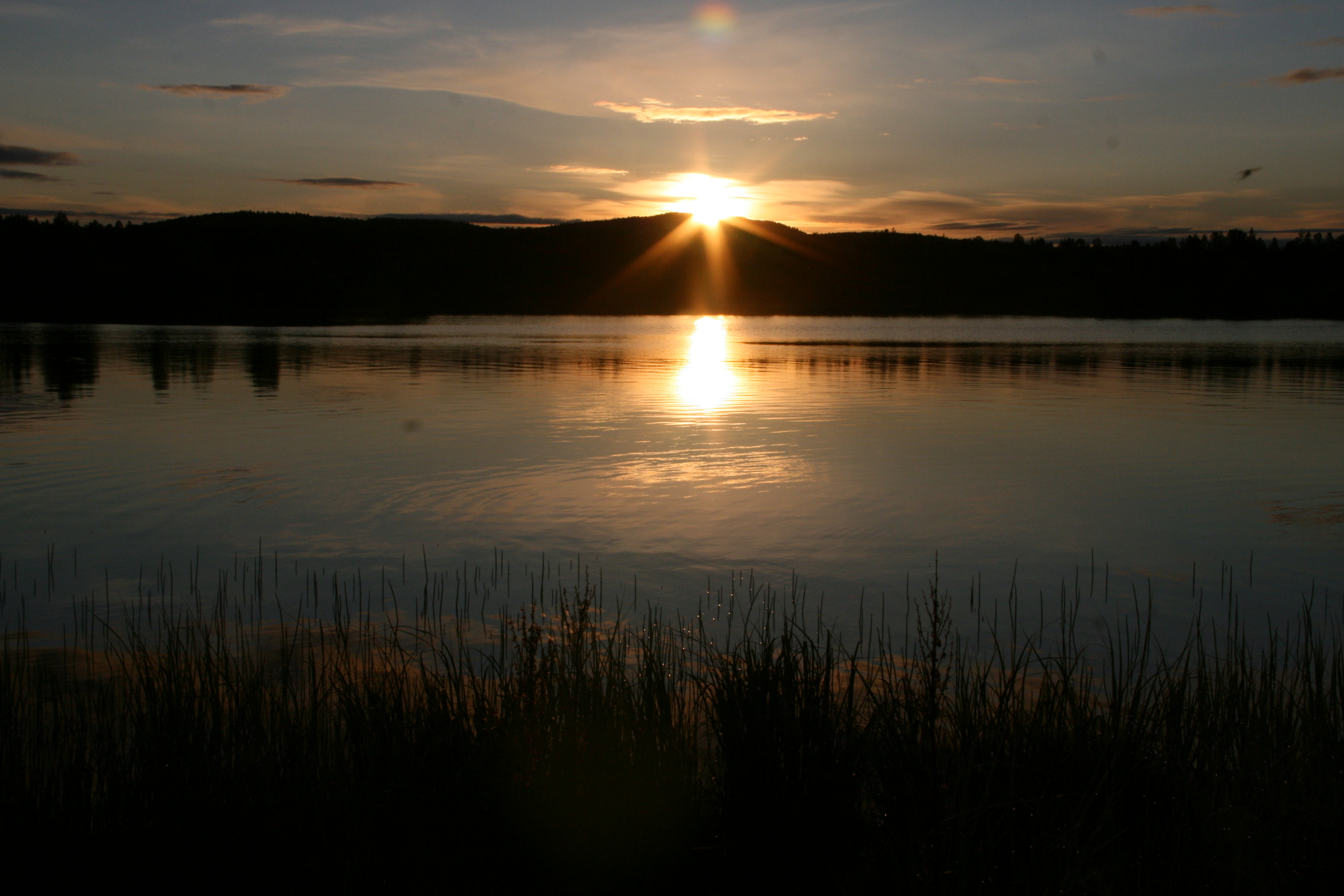
Midnight sun in Inari, northern Finland

Most of Finland lies within the geographical UTC+02:00 offset. The southwestern coast of Finland, including the city of Turku, the northwestern most part of Finland, including the villages Kilpisjärvi and Kaaresuvanto, and Åland are all located west of 22°30' East, and fall under the geographical offset of UTC+01:00. Finland's standard meridian is located at the 30th meridian east. Northernmost Finland is within the Arctic Circle and has a polar night lasting 51 days and a polar day lasting 73 days. Because of Finland's high latitude, in summer there is no local utility to daylight saving time. All localities north of Sodankylä (67°25'N) experience polar night. The southernmost localities of Finland experience less than six hours of daylight in winter and an average of 20 hours of daylight in summer. At Muotkavaara, a tripoint border between Finland, Norway and Russia, three time zones meet during Finland's winter time: Central European Time (UTC+01:00) in Norway, Eastern European Time (UTC+02:00) in Finland, and Moscow Time (UTC+03:00) in Russia.

Standard time
Daylight saving time

Sunrise/sunset times for Helsinki, Finland
Month (Note: On the first of every month.)	Jan	Feb	Mar	Apr	May	Jun	Jul	Aug	Sep	Oct	Nov	Dec
Sunrise	09:24	08:35	07:19	06:46	05:18	04:08	04:00	04:59	06:14	07:25	07:43	08:56
Sunset	15:24	16:33	17:47	20:04	21:19	22:29	22:47	21:52	20:25	18:53	16:24	15:22
Hours of daylight	6	8	10.5	13.3	16	18.3	18.7	16.8	14.1	11.4	8.6	6.4
Source: National Oceanic and Atmospheric Administration

== Maintenance ==
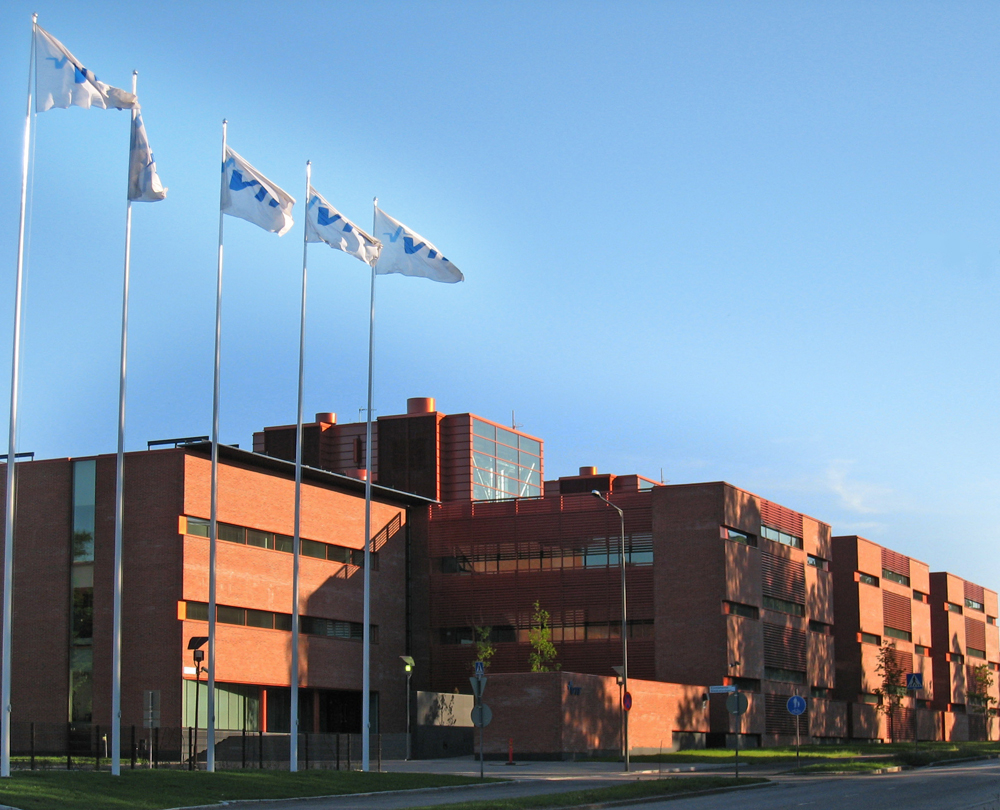
The VTT Technical Research Centre in Espoo maintains Finland's official time.

The VTT Technical Research Centre of Finland and the Centre for Metrology and Accreditation are responsible for implementing leap seconds to Finland's time zone, following the International Bureau of Weights and Measures as defined by the International Telecommunication Union. Finland adopted Coordinated Universal Time (UTC) in 1972 in order to implement these leap seconds and remain in the correct atomic time of Earth's rotation. Since Finland's first leap second occurred on 30 June 1972, 28 more have been implemented – occurring on either 30 June or 31 December – the latest occurring on 31 December 2016. VTT also transmits a high-precision time signal produced by six atomic clocks that maintain Finland's official time zone at a frequency of 25 megahertz to make sure the official timekeeping devices in Finland do not fall behind. Since the end of 2009, VTT's official time has remained within 30 nanoseconds of UTC. Furthermore, VTT is also responsible for clock synchronisation on computer networks connected via the Internet, relying on the Network Time Protocol (NTP), which is supported by the Ministry of Finance, and takes time directly from other external sources, either GPS, an atomic clock or a BIOS clock. Though the protocol is designed to account for variable latency between networks, the accuracy of time synchronisation ultimately still depends on a network's internet connection speed and bandwidth. As an example, VTT noted that a network connection at a speed of 100 Mbit/s results in a 0.0001 second delay between the official time of Finland and that of what is displayed on a computer. The accuracy worsens with slower connection speeds and delayed bandwidth.

== Notation ==
In Finnish writing, the 24-hour clock notation is used. A baseline dot is used as the standardised and recommended separator between the hour and the minute (e.g. "15.07" or "8.27"). The use of a colon is also common especially in relation to telecommunications and digital clocks, but is not recommended in normal text. Midnight is written as "24.00". The notation for times within the first hour of the day starts with one zero (e.g. "0.15"). Leading zeros are not used (e.g. no "09"). If greater accuracy is needed, seconds are added using the same symbol as the one used to separate the hours from the minutes (e.g. "1.27.36"). Fractions of a second are added using the comma as separator (e.g. "1.27.36,30"). For time ranges, a hyphen is used (e.g. "12–21" for noon till 9 pm).

In normal text, the time can also be spelled out using the 12-hour clock, with clarifications as needed (e.g. nine in the morning: morning+nine → "aamuyhdeksältä"). The practice in Swedish is similar. Finland previously used the 12-hour clock, switching to 24-hour time in 1928 to comply with the 1926 Schedule Conference on European Railways' agreement for universal timetables across railways.

== IANA time zone database ==
In the IANA time zone database, Finland is given two zones in the file zone.tab – Europe/Helsinki and Europe/Mariehamn for Åland. "AX" and "FI" refer to the country's ISO 3166-1 alpha-2 country codes, the former being for Åland and the latter for the country in general. The table below displays data taken directly from zone.tab of the IANA time zone database. Columns marked with * are the columns from zone.tab itself:

c.c.*	coordinates*	TZ*	Comments	UTC offset	DST
FI	+6010+02458	Europe/Helsinki		+02:00	+03:00
AX	+6006+01957	Europe/Mariehamn		+02:00	+03:00

Computers which do not support "Europe/Helsinki" or "Europe/Mariehamn" may use the older POSIX syntax: TZ="EET-2EEST,M3.5.0/3,M10.5.0/4".

== See also ==
- Time in Europe
  - Time in Estonia
  - Time in Latvia
  - Time in Norway
  - Time in Russia
  - Time in Sweden
- List of time zones by country
- List of time zones by UTC offset

== Notes and references ==
=== Bibliography ===
- Gould, Ralph Edgar (1925). Standard Time Throughout the World (1 ed.). United States National Bureau of Standards.
- Gould, Ralph Edgar (1935). Standard Time Throughout the World (3 ed.). United States National Bureau of Standards.
- Heikki, Oja (1999). Aikakirja (PDF) (in Finnish) (2 ed.). Almanac Office of the University of Helsinki. ISBN 9511163345.
- Heikki, Oja (2007). Aikakirja 2007 (in Finnish). Almanac Office of the University of Helsinki. ISBN 978-9521032219.
- Heikki, Oja (2013). Aikakirja 2013 (PDF) (in Finnish). Almanac Office of the University of Helsinki.
- Lehti, Raimo; Markkanen, Tapio (2010). History of Astronomy in Finland 1828–1918. Societas Scientiarum Fennica. ISBN 978-9516533790.
- Maskelyne, Nevil (1934). The Astronomical Ephemeris. Her Majesty's Stationery Office.
- Simojoki, Heikki Juhani (1978). The History of Geophysics in Finland 1828–1918. Societas Scientiarum Fennica. ISBN 9516530788.
