= Hattuvaara =

Village in Eastern Finland

Coordinates: 62°55′55″N 31°16′54″E

Hattuvaara is a village in Ilomantsi municipality in the region of North Karelia, about 40 km north-east from the municipality centre and near the border with Russia.

It is the most eastern village in Finland and in the continental part of European Union (in the EU, only Cyprus is located further to the east). The easternmost point of Finland and of the continental European Union is located on an island in the lake Virmajärvi 19 km east from Hattuvaara.

The village exists since 17th century and has the oldest Orthodox chapel (tsasouna) in Finland, built at the end of the 18th century and dedicated to St. Peter and St. Paul.

During the Continuation War, a part of the Battle of Ilomantsi was fought near Hattuvaara on July 27, 1944. There are several monuments erected around the village to commemorate these events.
