= Nuorgam =

Northernmost settlement of Finland and the European Union

Nuorgam Njuorggán
- Village
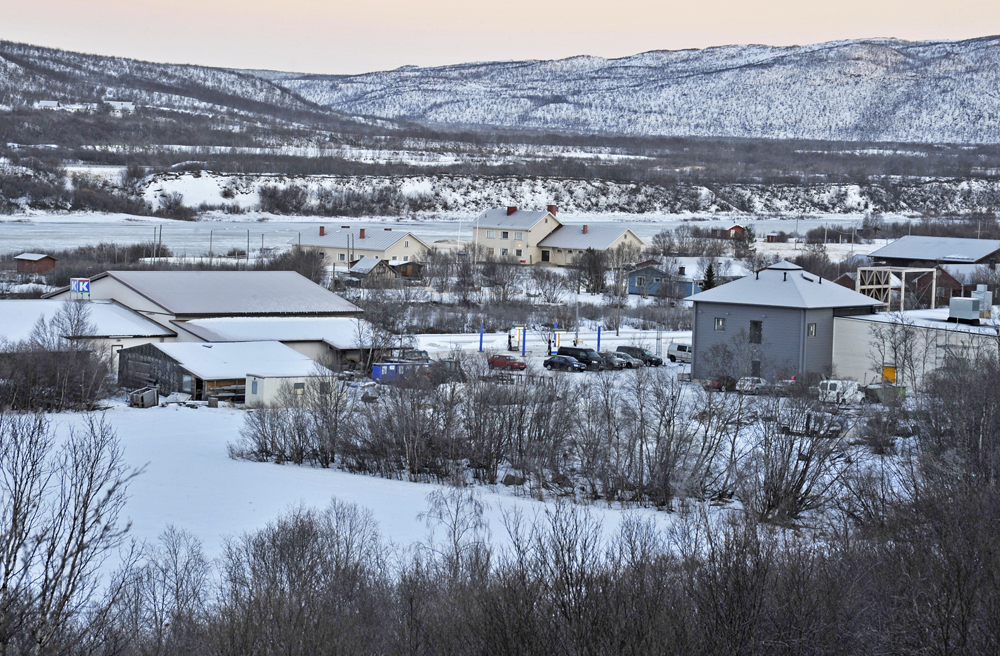

- Location in Finland
- Coordinates: 70°04′50″N 027°52′30″E
- Country: Finland
- Region: Lapland
- Municipality: Utsjoki

Population (2025)
  - Total: 200

Nuorgam (Northern Sami: Njuorggán) is a traditional Sámi village in the northern periphery of Finland. Administratively, it is part of the municipality of Utsjoki, within the region of Lapland. It is the northernmost point of Finland, as well as the northernmost point of the European Union. As of 2025, it had a population of approximately 200 people.

The 2022 Finnish action film Sisu was filmed primarily in Nuorgam.

== Etymology ==
Nuorgam is a Finnish adaptation of the Northern Sámi name Njuorggán, which is of unknown meaning and origin. The Finnish name was Niorgaisoando in 1740, became Niorkam in the 1770s when it started to be used as a surname, and became Njorkama in 1804. The first family to use the surname Nuorgam arrived in the village sometime in the late 18th century from the nearby village of Pulmangi on the Norwegian side.

== Geography ==
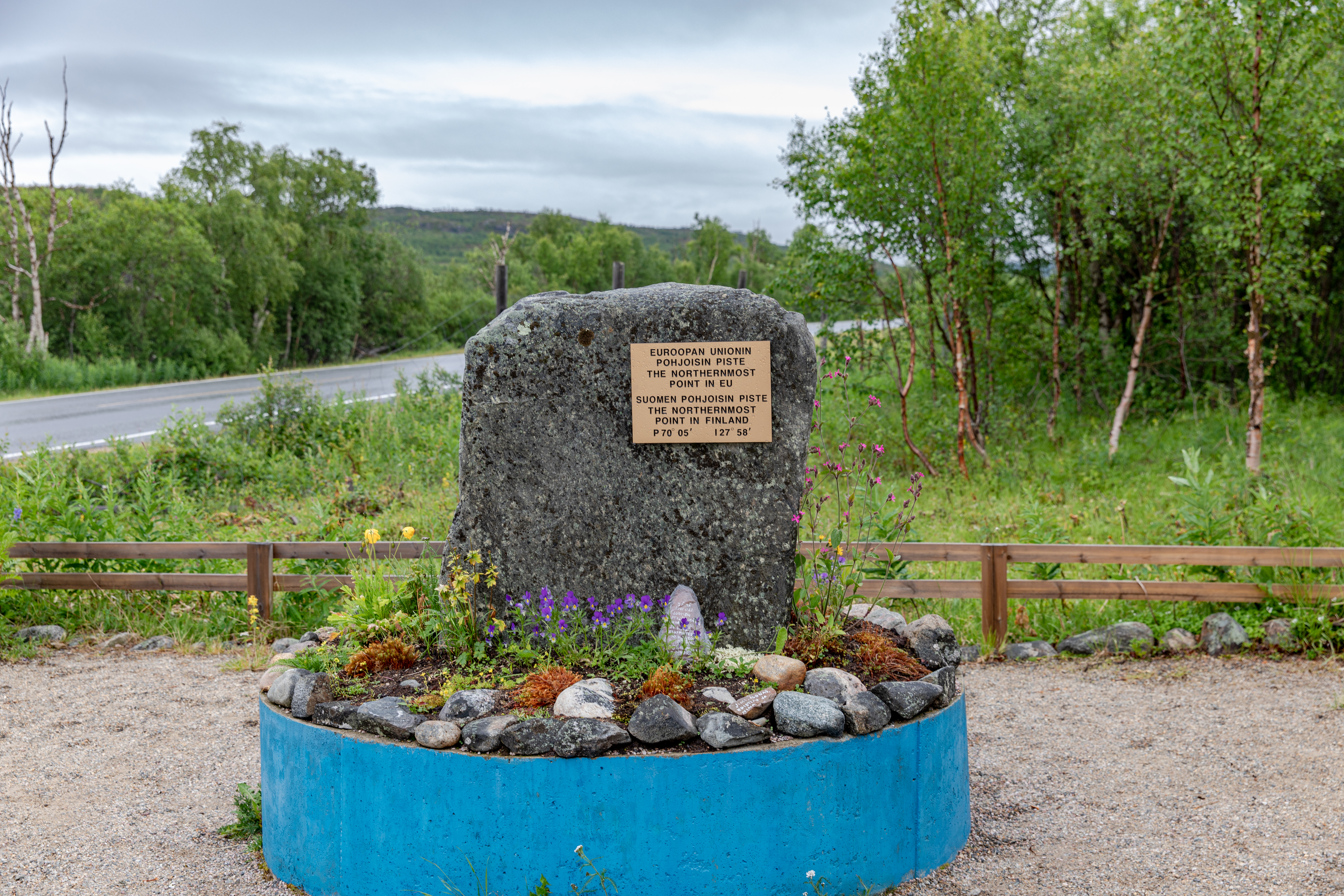
Monument marking the northernmost point of Finland and the European Union

Nuorgam is located in the municipality of Utsjoki, situated on the Teno (Tana) river, opposite of the Njuorggánvárri estuary in Norway. Located 500 kilometres (310 mi) above the Arctic Circle, it is the northernmost settlement of Finland and the European Union.

=== Climate ===
Climate data for Utsjoki Nuorgam (1991–2020 normals, records 1970–present)
Month	Jan	Feb	Mar	Apr	May	Jun	Jul	Aug	Sep	Oct	Nov	Dec	Year
Record high °C (°F)	6.9 (44.4)	6.6 (43.9)	7.0 (44.6)	14.3 (57.7)	29.6 (85.3)	31.7 (89.1)	32.5 (90.5)	30.7 (87.3)	23.8 (74.8)	14.4 (57.9)	10.8 (51.4)	8.3 (46.9)	32.5 (90.5)
Mean daily maximum °C (°F)	−6.6 (20.1)	−6.4 (20.5)	−2.6 (27.3)	2.4 (36.3)	8.0 (46.4)	13.4 (56.1)	17.3 (63.1)	15.3 (59.5)	10.6 (51.1)	3.1 (37.6)	−2.2 (28.0)	−4.3 (24.3)	4.0 (39.2)
Daily mean °C (°F)	−11.9 (10.6)	−11.4 (11.5)	−7.2 (19.0)	−1.8 (28.8)	4.1 (39.4)	9.0 (48.2)	12.6 (54.7)	10.8 (51.4)	6.6 (43.9)	0.1 (32.2)	−5.9 (21.4)	−8.9 (16.0)	−0.3 (31.5)
Mean daily minimum °C (°F)	−16.1 (3.0)	−15.5 (4.1)	−12.1 (10.2)	−6.1 (21.0)	0.3 (32.5)	5.2 (41.4)	8.4 (47.1)	7.0 (44.6)	3.0 (37.4)	−2.8 (27.0)	−9.6 (14.7)	−13.1 (8.4)	−4.3 (24.3)
Record low °C (°F)	−45.1 (−49.2)	−42.9 (−45.2)	−39.0 (−38.2)	−30.4 (−22.7)	−19.2 (−2.6)	−2.4 (27.7)	0.2 (32.4)	−4.3 (24.3)	−10.0 (14.0)	−24.6 (−12.3)	−33.9 (−29.0)	−37.5 (−35.5)	−45.1 (−49.2)
Source 1: FMI normals 1991–2020
Source 2: Record highs and lows

== Demographics ==
As of 2025, the population of Nuorgam was approximately 200 people. Northern Sámi, Finnish, and Norwegian are spoken among the local populace.

== Economy ==
The local economy is a mix of traditional jobs like hunting, fishing, and cattle farming, and modern initiatives like cross-border trade and tourism. The village is reportedly fully employed, with many residents having jobs in Norway.

== Transport ==
Ivalo Airport and Kirkenes Airport (in Norway) have flights to and from Nuorgam. The village can also be accessed by road, and a number of Finnish accommodation companies offer transport there.

== In popular culture ==
The Finnish action film Sisu, directed by Jalmari Helander, was filmed mainly in Nuorgam in 2021. Set during the Lapland War of World War II, producer Petri Jokiranta commented that the remoteness of the village in the Finnish tundra provided an ideal setting, as was the abandoned Kaamanen Airport for some scenes in particular. Locals were involved in the film's production and gave permission for film sets to be built in the village.

== See also ==
- Utsjoki (village)
