= Geography of the European Union =

- Topographic map of the European Union

- Continent: Predominantly Europe, with territories elsewhere
- Area: Ranked 8th
  - Total: 4,225,104 km^{2} (1,631,322 sq mi)
  - Land: 96.92%
  - Water: 3.08%
- Coastline: 65,993 km (41,006 mi)
- Borders: Total land borders: 14,111.4 km Albania 282 km, Andorra 120.3 km, Belarus 1,050 km, Bosnia and Herzegovina 932 km, Brazil 673 km, Liechtenstein 34.9 km, North Macedonia 394 km, Moldova 450 km, Monaco 4.4 km, Montenegro 23 km, Morocco 16 km, Norway 2,348 km, Russia 2,257 km, San Marino 39 km, Serbia 1,263 km, Suriname 510 km, Switzerland 1,811 km, Turkey 446 km, Ukraine 1,257 km, United Kingdom 656.2 km, Vatican City 3.2 km
- Highest point: Mont Blanc; 4,810.45 m
- Lowest point: Lammefjord, Zuidplaspolder -7 m
- Longest river: Danube; 2,860 km
- Largest lake: Vänern; 5,650 km^{2}

The geography of the European Union describes the geographic features of the European Union (EU), a multinational polity that occupies a large portion of Europe and covers 4,225,104 km^{2} (1,631,322 sq mi). Its European territory extends northeast to Finland, northwest to Ireland, southeast to Cyprus in Asia and southwest to the Spanish exclaves on the Mediterranean shores of North Africa. Additionally, the EU includes numerous islands around the world, and French Guiana in South America.

Collectively, it represents the seventh largest territory in the world by area. Including all overseas territories, the EU shares borders with 20 countries.

== Geography by member states ==
The European Union has 27 member states. See the geography of each current member state:

- Austria
- Belgium
- Bulgaria
- Croatia
- Cyprus
- Czechia
- Denmark
- Estonia
- Finland
- France
- Germany
- Greece
- Hungary
- Ireland
- Italy
- Latvia
- Lithuania
- Luxembourg
- Malta
- Netherlands
- Poland
- Portugal
- Romania
- Slovakia
- Slovenia
- Spain
- Sweden

== Physical geography ==
Most of the European Union is on the European continent. The only member state of the EU which is geographically outside of Europe is Cyprus, which is in West Asia. The EU includes less than half of the territory of Europe. Significant parts of the continent especially in the east (e.g. European Russia, Ukraine, Belarus) and smaller parts in the north and centre are not part of the EU. The member states of the EU have land borders with 21 other countries and 3 dependent territories.

It is estimated that the coastline of the continental European Union is 66,000 km (41,000 miles) long, bordering the Atlantic Ocean, Mediterranean Sea and Black Sea, and the Baltic Sea. With overseas territories included, the European Union is shored by the Indian and Pacific Oceans as well as by the Caribbean Sea. European mountain ranges include the Alps, Pyrenees, Carpathian Mountains, Balkan Mountains and Scandinavian Mountains, and the border mountain ranges of the Caucasus and the Urals; the highest mountain in the Union is Mont Blanc in the Alps. Lake Vänern in Sweden is the largest lake in the Union.

Several overseas territories and dependencies of various member states are also formally part of the EU (for Spain: the Canary Islands, Ceuta and Melilla; for Portugal: the Azores and Madeira; for France: Réunion, French Guiana, Martinique, Guadeloupe, Mayotte and Saint Martin) while in other cases territories associated with member states are not part of the EU (for Denmark: Greenland and the Faroe Islands; for the Netherlands: Aruba, Curaçao, Sint Maarten; for France: French Polynesia, Wallis and Futuna or New Caledonia).

Including overseas territories of member states, the EU includes most types of climate from Arctic to tropical. Meteorological averages for the EU as a whole are therefore not meaningful. The majority of the population live in areas with a Mediterranean climate (southern Europe), a temperate maritime climate (western Europe), or a warm summer continental or hemiboreal climate (in eastern member states).

European Union Outermost regions (OMR) (part of the EU) Overseas countries and territories (OCT) (not part of the EU)

=== Geology ===
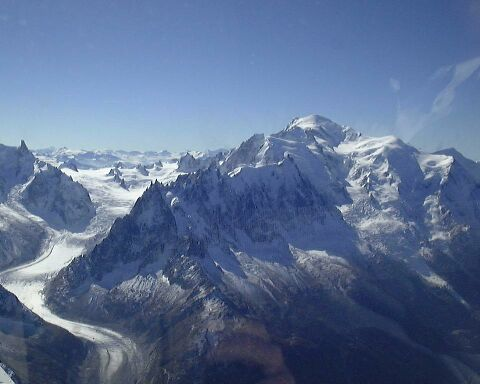
Mont Blanc, Italy/France.

Europe's most significant feature is the dichotomy between highland and mountainous Southern Europe and a vast, partially underwater, northern plain ranging from the British Isles in the west to Poland in the east. These two halves are separated by the mountain chains of Pyrenees, Alps, Carpathian and Balkan Mountains. The northern plains are delimited in the west by the Scandinavian Mountains. Major shallow water bodies submerging parts of the northern plains are the Celtic Sea, the North Sea, the Baltic Sea complex, and the Barents Sea.

The northern plain contains the old geological continent of Baltica, and so may be regarded as the "main continent", while peripheral highlands and mountainous regions in south and west constitute fragments from various other geological continents.

The geology of Europe is hugely varied and complex, and gives rise to the wide variety of landscapes found across the continent, like the rolling plains of Hungary.

=== Climate ===
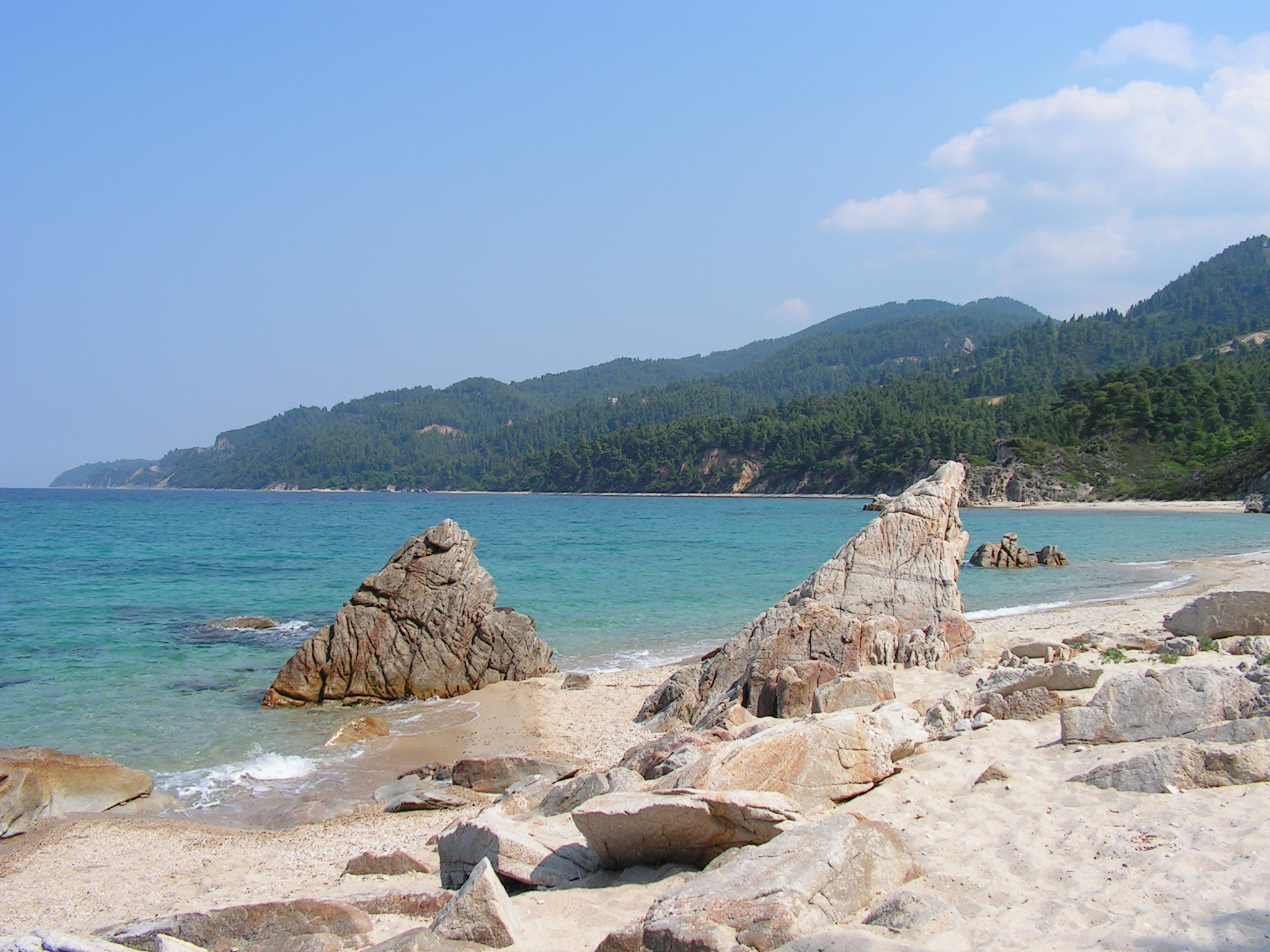
22 member countries are influenced by extensive coastlines and oceanic climate, (Mediterranean, Greece)

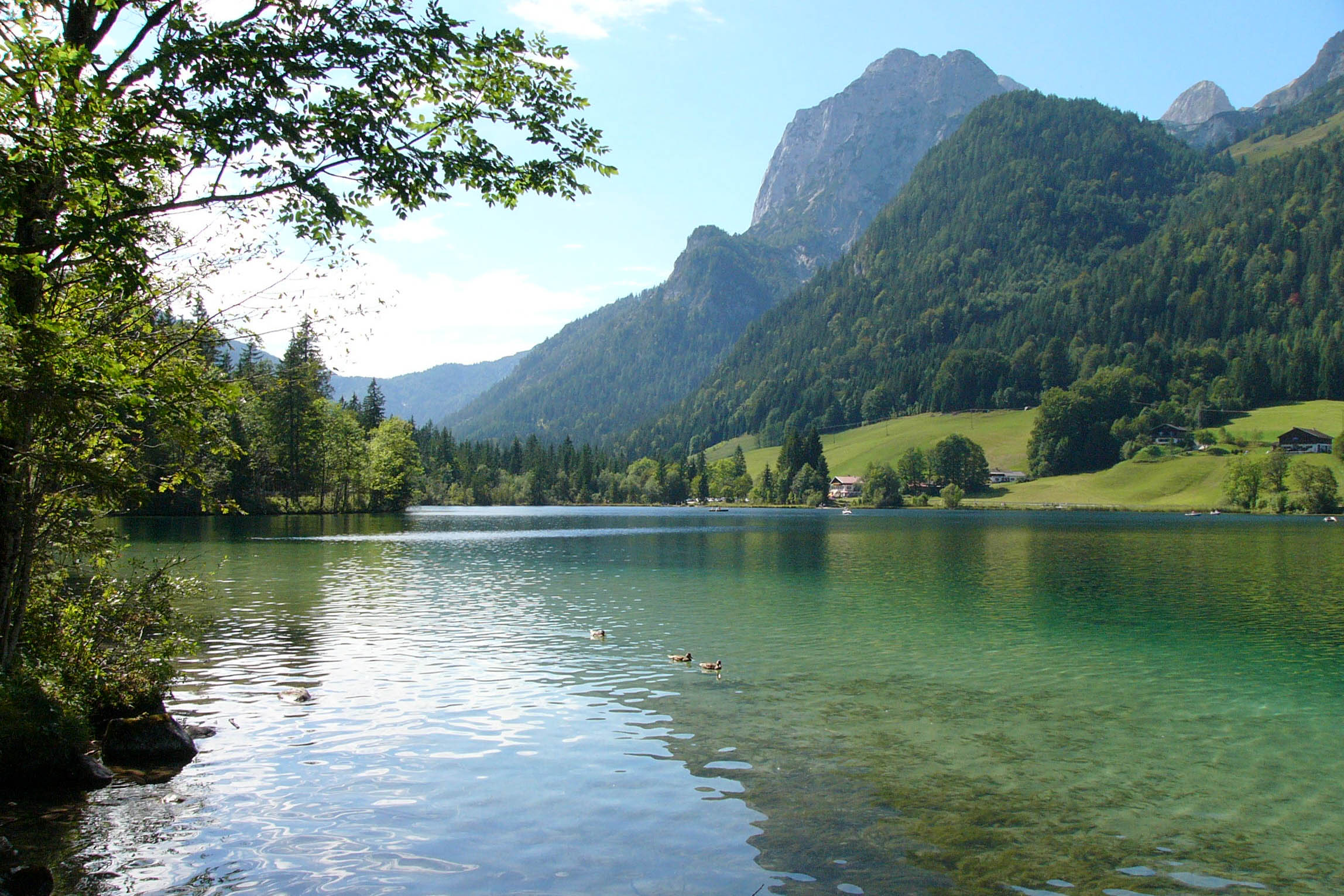
Alpine scenery in Bavaria, Germany

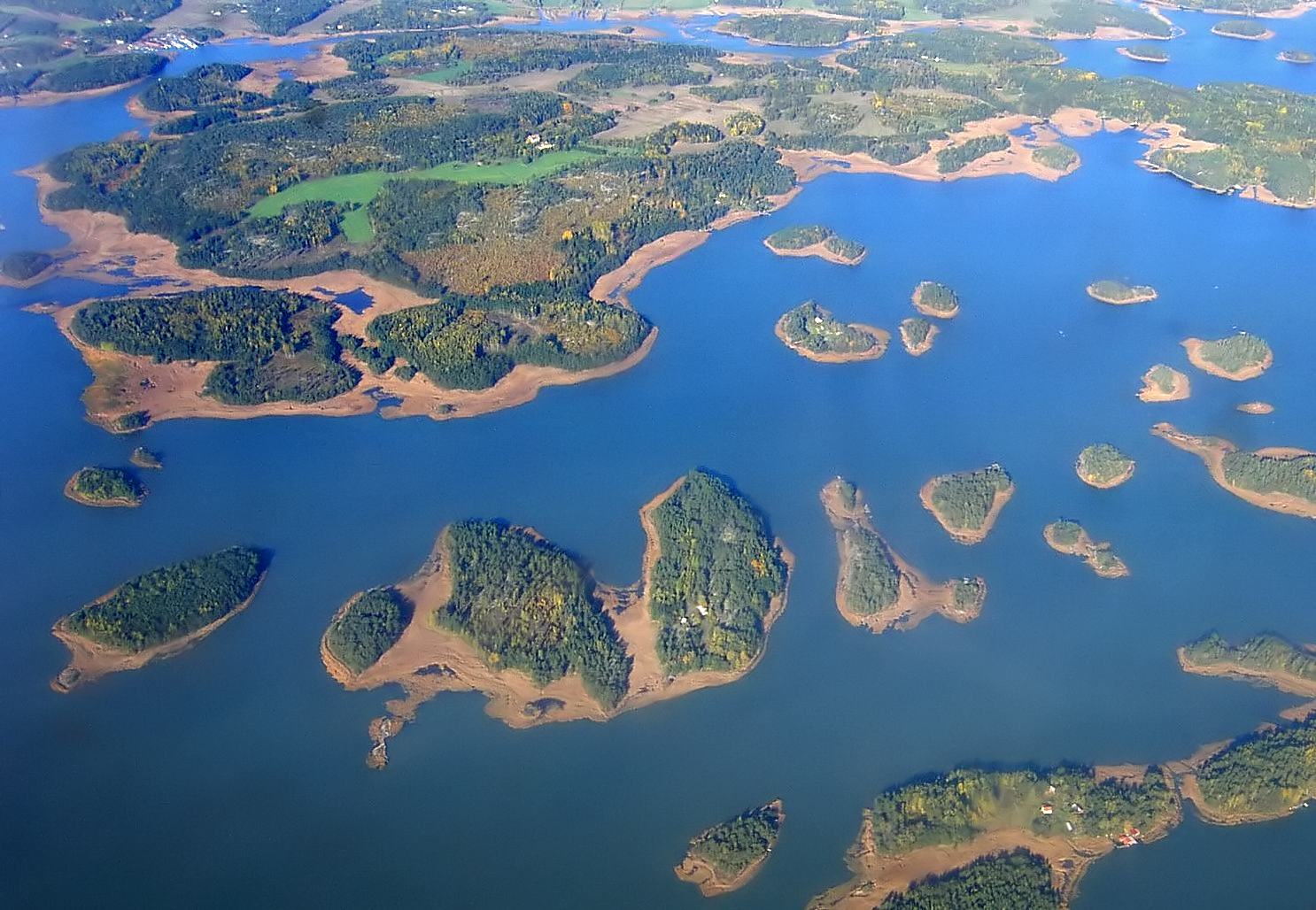
An aerial photograph of Naantali Archipelago, Finland

The climate of the European Union is of a temperate, continental nature, with a maritime climate prevailing on the western coasts and a mediterranean climate in the south. The climate is strongly conditioned by the Gulf Stream, which warms the western region to levels unattainable at similar latitudes on other continents. Western Europe is oceanic, while eastern Europe is continental and dry. Four seasons occur in western Europe, while southern Europe experiences wet winters and dry summers. Southern Europe is hot and dry during the summer months. The heaviest precipitation occurs downwind of water bodies due to the prevailing westerlies, with higher amounts also seen in the Alps. Tornadoes occur within Europe, but tend to be weak. The Netherlands experiences a disproportionately high number of tornadic events.

The mildest climate within the European Union occurs in the Portuguese island of Madeira, where the average temperature varies from 19 °C (66 °F) during the day and 13 °C (55 °F) at night in winter to 26 °C (79 °F) during the day and 19 °C (66 °F) at night in summer. Also, the mildest climate occurs in the Spanish island of Gran Canaria (Canary Islands), where the average temperature varies from 21 °C (70 °F) during the day and 15 °C (59 °F) at night in winter to 27 °C (81 °F) during the day and 22 °C (72 °F) at night in summer. Both these islands lie in the Atlantic. As for the land on the European continent, the mildest climate occurs in the northwest part of Iberian Peninsula (also Spain and Portugal), between Bilbao, A Coruña and Porto. In this the coastal strand, the average temperature varies from 10–14 °C (50–57 °F) during the day and about 5 °C (41 °F) at night in January to 22–26 °C (72–79 °F) during the day and 15–16 °C (59–61 °F) at night in the middle of summer.

=== Rivers ===
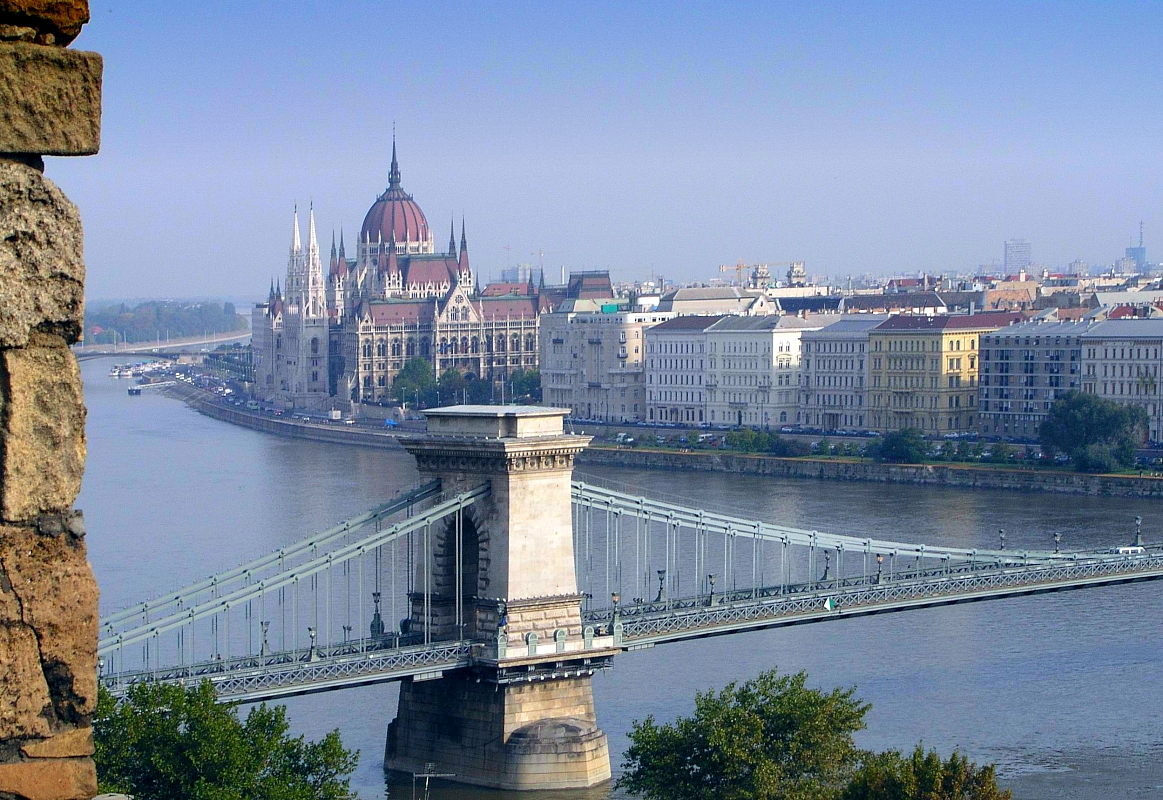
The Danube (pictured in Budapest), is the longest river in the European Union.

The most important rivers in the European Union are Danube, Rhine, Elbe, Oder, Vistula, Seine, and Rhône, among others.

==== European Union rivers by discharge ====
1. Danube – 6,450 m^{3}/s
2. Rhine – 2,315 m^{3}/s
3. Rhône – 1,900 m^{3}/s (Waal – 1,500 m^{3}/s as main distributary of Rhine)
4. * Sava – 1,609 m^{3}/s (tributary of the Danube)
5. Po – 1,460 m^{3}/s (largest river in Italy)
6. Vistula – 1,080 m^{3}/s
7. Loire – 889 m^{3}/s
8. * Tisza – 863 m^{3}/s (tributary of the Danube)
9. Elbe – 860 m^{3}/s
10. * Inn – 735 m^{3}/s (tributary of the Danube)

==== European Union rivers by length ====
The following are the longest rivers in the EU alongside their approximate lengths:

1. Danube - 2,860 km (1,780 miles) (partially - 2628 km in the EU)
2. Rhine – 1,236 km (768 miles) (partially – nearly 1100 km in the EU, nearly 150 km entirely in Switzerland or on its border with Liechtenstein)
3. Elbe – 1,091 km (678 miles)
4. Vistula – 1,047 km (651 miles)
5. Tagus – 1,038 km (645 miles)
6. Loire – 1,012 km (629 miles)
7. Ebro – 960 km (600 miles)
8. Meuse – 925 km (575 miles)
9. Douro – 897 km (557 miles)
10. Oder – 854 km (531 miles)
11. Guadiana – 829 km (515 miles)
12. Rhône – 815 km (506 miles)
13. * Warta – 795 km (494 miles) (major tributary of Oder)
14. Seine - 776 km (482 miles)
15. * Mureș – 761 km (473 miles) (tributary of Tisza)
16. * Prut – *953 km (592 miles) (partially, border of the EU for nearly 742 km) (tributary of the Danube)
17. * Sava – *933 km (580 miles) (partially – 726 km) (tributary of the Danube)
18. * Drava – 710 km (440 miles) (tributary of the Danube)
19. Po – 682 km (424 miles)
20. Guadalquivir – 657 km (408 miles)
21. * Olt – 615 km (382 miles) (tributary of the Danube)
22. * Tisza – *966 km (600 miles) (1,358 km (844 miles) before 1880) (partially – 605 km in the EU) (tributary of the Danube)
23. Garonne – 602 km (374 miles)
24. * Siret – *647 km (402 miles) (partially – 559 km)
25. Kemijoki – 550 km (340 miles) (longest river in Finland)
26. * Moselle 546 km (339 miles) (major left tributary of Rhine)
27. * Main 525 km (326 miles) (major right tributary of Rhine)
28. Torne – 522 km (324 miles) (very small part near the source is in Norway)
29. Dalälven – 520 km (320 miles) (longest river entirely in Sweden)
30. * Inn (river) 518 km (322 miles) (tributary of the Danube)
31. Marne – 514 km (319 miles) (major tributary of the Seine)
32. Maritsa – 515 km (320 miles) (partially – 513 km in the EU: 309 km entirety in Bulgaria; the lower course forms the border of the EU for 204 km)
33. Júcar – 509 km (316 miles)
34. Dordogne – 483 km (300 miles)
35. * Saône – 480 km (300 miles) (major tributary of Rhône)
36. Neman – *914 km (568 miles) (partially – 475 km in the EU, 116 km of them as border of the EU)
37. Ume – 470 km (290 miles)
38. ** Mur – 464 km (288 miles) (tributary of Drava, Danube)
39. Ångerman – 460 km (290 miles)
40. * Klarälven – 460 km (290 miles) (major tributary of the Göta älv)
41. Lule – *460 km (290 miles) (a very small part near the source is in Norway)
42. Gauja – 452 km (281 miles)
43. Weser – 452 km (281 miles)
44. Kalix – 450 km (280 miles)
45. * Vindel River – 445 km (277 miles) (major tributary of the Ume River)
46. Ljusnan – 430 km (270 miles)
47. Indalsälven – 430 km (270 miles)
48. * Vltava – 430 km (270 miles) (major tributary of the Elbe)
49. Ialomița – 417 km (259 miles)
50. Struma – 415 km (258 miles)
51. ** Someș – 415 km (258 miles) (tributary of Tisza, Danube)
52. Adige – 410 km (250 miles)
53. Skellefte – 410 km (250 miles)
54. Tiber – 406 km (252 miles)
55. * Vah – 406 km (252 miles) (tributary of the Danube)
56. Pite – 400 km (250 miles)
57. * Faxälven – 399 km (248 miles) (major tributary of the Ångerman)
58. Vardar – 388 km (241 miles)
59. Charente – 381 km (237 miles)
60. * Iskar – 368 km (229 miles) (longest river entirely in Bulgaria) (tributary of the Danube)
61. Shannon – 360 km (224 miles)
62. Daugava – *1,020 km (630 miles) (partially – 357 km in the EU)
63. Minho – 350 km (217 miles)
64. * Tundzha – 365 km (227 miles) (partially – 328 km) (major tributary of Maritsa)
65. Segura – 325 km (202 miles)

== Human geography ==
=== Demographics ===
The most populous member state is Germany, with an estimated 82.1 million people, and the least populous member state is Malta with 0.5 million. Birth rates in the EU are low with the average woman having 1.6 children. The highest crude birth rates is in the Republic of Ireland with 16.876 births per thousand people per year and in France with 13.013 births per thousand people per year. Germany has the lowest birth rate in Europe with 8.221 births per thousand people per year.

Population and land area of the 27 member states of the European Union (1 January 2014 estimate)
Member State	Population		Land area		Pop. density People/km^{2}
Member State	No.	% of total	(km^{2})	% of total EU	Pop. density People/km^{2}
Austria	8,507,786	1.68%	83,858	1.9%	99.7
Belgium	11,203,992	2.21%	30,510	0.7%	352.0
Bulgaria	7,245,677	1.43%	110,912	2.5%	68.5
Croatia	4,246,700	0.84%	56,594	1.3%	75.8
Cyprus	858,000	0.17%	9,250	0.2%	86.6
Czech Republic	10,512,419	2.07%	78,866	1.8%	132.8
Denmark	5,627,235	1.11%	43,094	1.0%	128.1
Estonia	1,315,819	0.26%	45,226	1.0%	29.6
Finland	5,451,270	1.07%	337,030	7.6%	15.8
France	65,856,609	12.98%	643,548	14.6%	99.6
Germany	80,780,000	15.92%	357,021	8.1%	229.9
Greece	10,992,589	2.17%	131,957	3.0%	85.4
Hungary	9,879,000	1.95%	93,030	2.1%	107.8
Ireland	4,604,029	0.91%	70,280	1.6%	64.3
Italy	60,782,668	11.98%	301,320	6.8%	200.4
Latvia	2,001,468	0.39%	64,589	1.5%	35.0
Lithuania	2,943,472	0.58%	65,200	1.5%	51.4
Luxembourg	549,680	0.11%	2,586	0.1%	190.1
Malta	425,384	0.08%	316	0.0%	1,305.7
Netherlands	16,829,289	3.32%	41,526	0.9%	396.9
Poland	38,495,659	7.59%	312,685	7.1%	121.9
Portugal	10,427,301	2.05%	92,931	2.1%	114.4
Romania	19,942,642	3.93%	238,391	5.4%	90.2
Slovakia	5,415,949	1.07%	48,845	1.1%	110.8
Slovenia	2,061,085	0.41%	20,253	0.5%	101.4
Spain	46,507,760	9.17%	504,782	11.4%	93.4
Sweden	9,644,864	1.90%	449,964	10.2%	20.6
EU	507,416,607	100.00%	4,324,782	100.0%	116.0

=== Largest cities ===
The European Union is home to more global cities than any other region in the world. Over 16 cities with populations over one million inhabitants, counted in its city proper. Densely populated regions that have no single core but have emerged from the connection of several cities and are now encompassing large metropolitan areas are Rhine-Ruhr having approximately 11.5 million inhabitants (Cologne, Düsseldorf, Dortmund et al.), Randstad approx. 7 million (Amsterdam, Rotterdam, The Hague et al.), the Flemish Diamond approx. 5.5 million, Frankfurt/Rhine-Main approx. 4 million (Frankfurt, Wiesbaden et al.) and the Upper Silesian Industry Area approx. 3.5 million. (Katowice, Sosnowiec et al.).

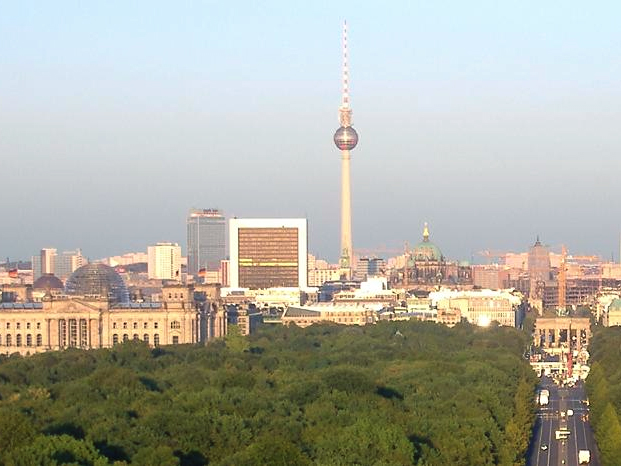
Berlin

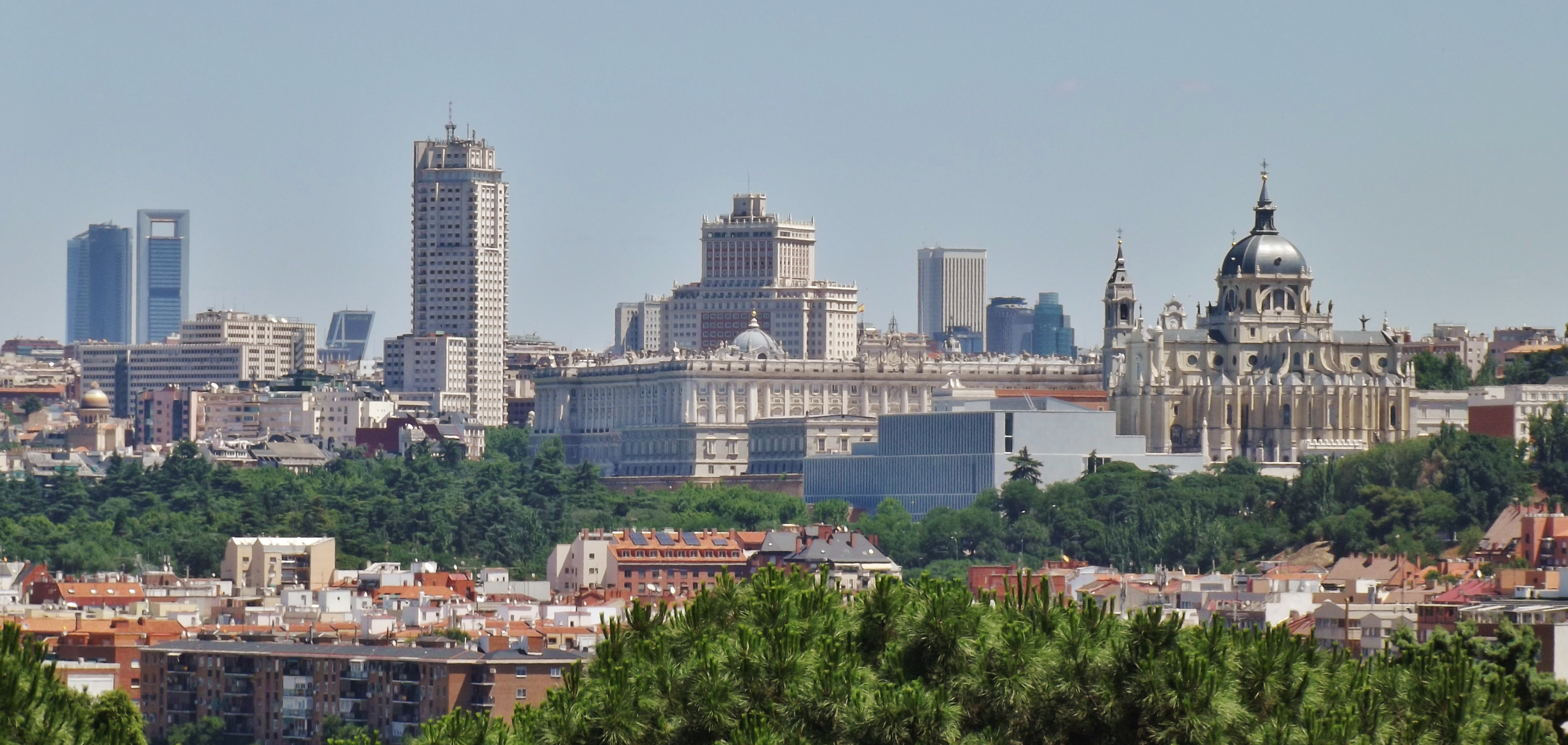
Madrid

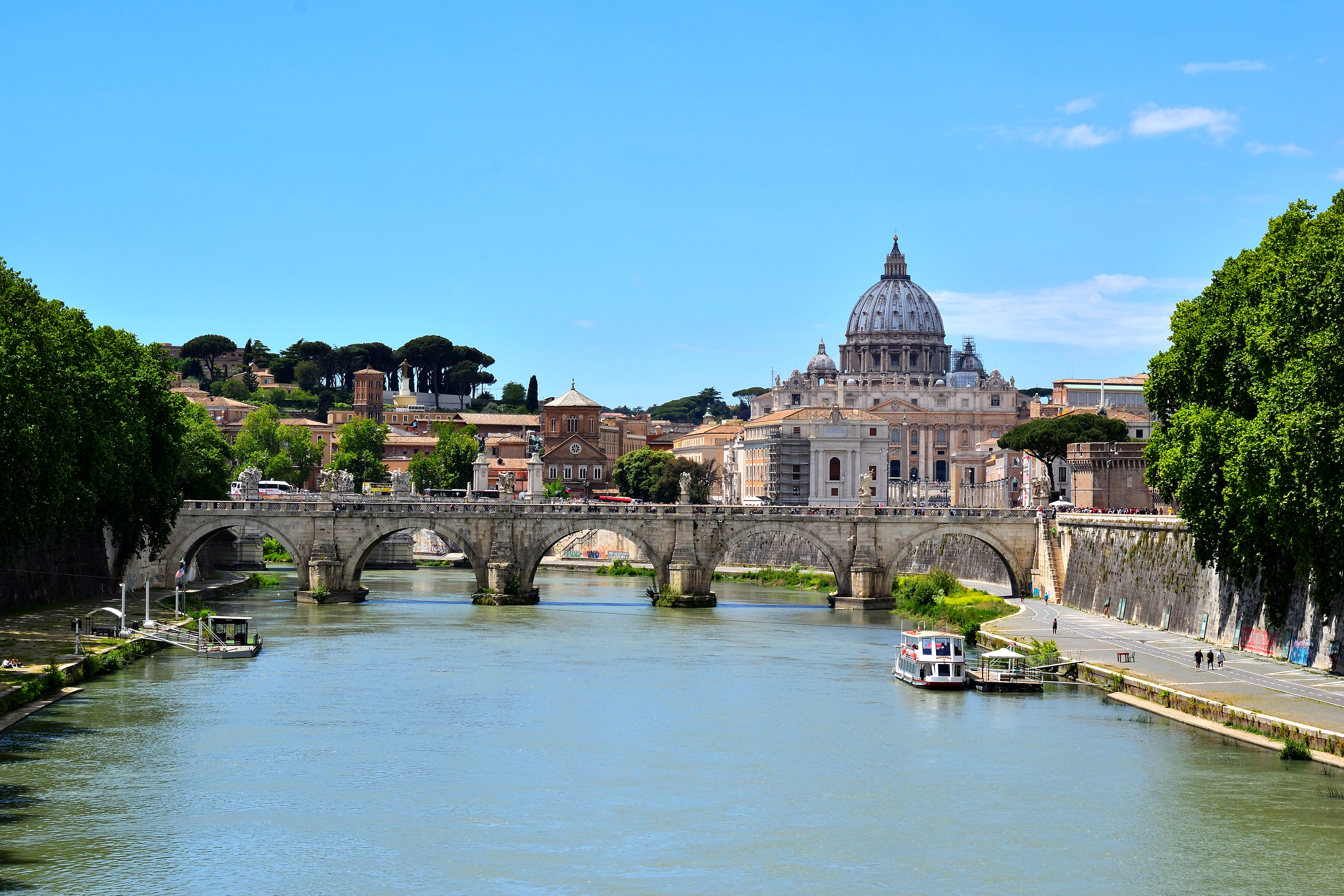
Rome

Paris

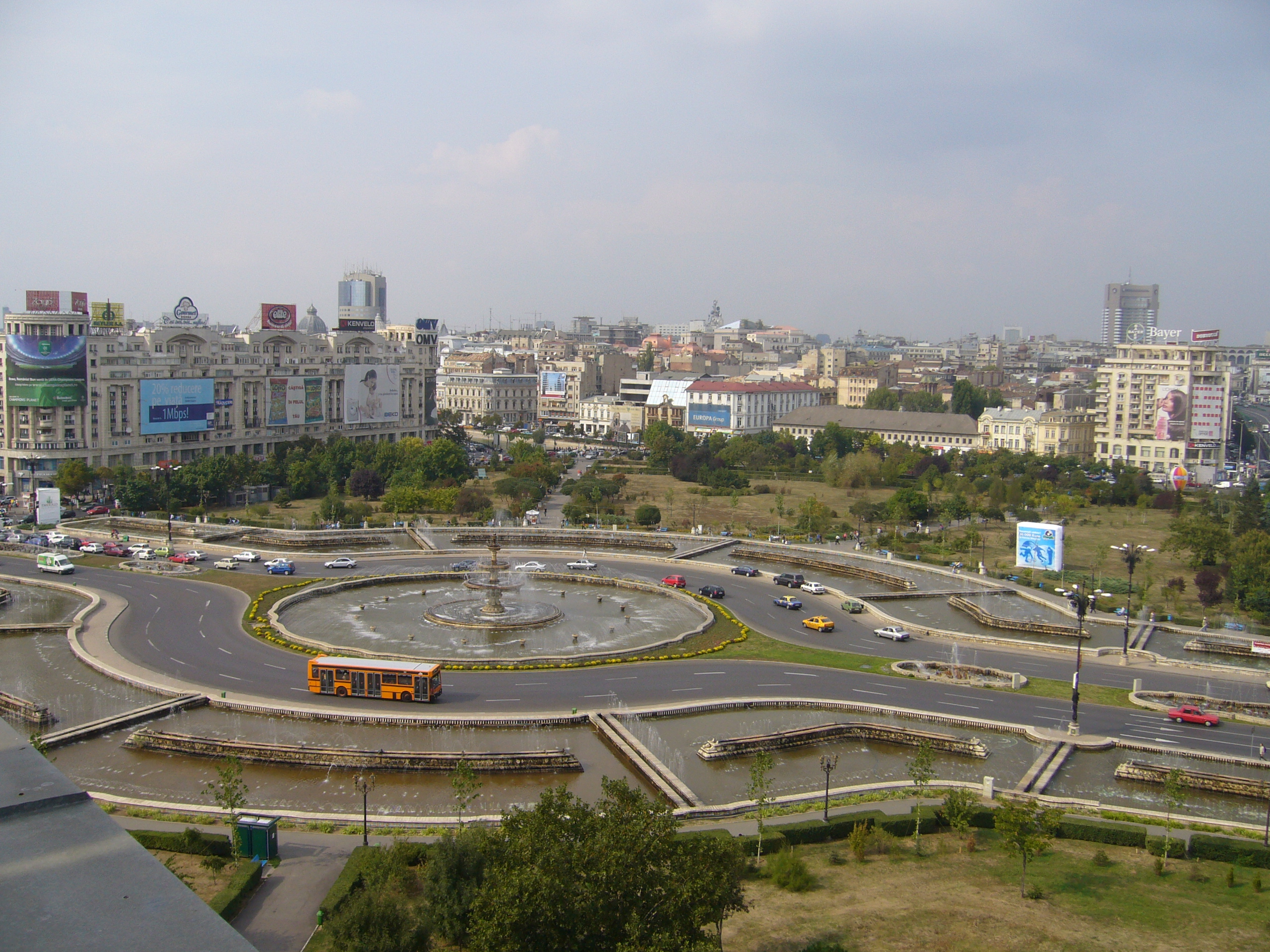
Bucharest

City proper	Population City limits in millions	Density per km^{2}	Urban area	Population Urban area in millions	Metro area	Population Metro area in millions
Berlin, Germany	3.8	4,210	Paris, France	10.1	Paris, France	11.7
Madrid, Spain	3.1	1,985	Madrid, Spain	6.2	Rhine-Ruhr, Germany	10.6
Rome, Italy	2.7	5,198	Ruhr, Germany	5.1	Randstad, Netherlands	7.0
Paris, France	2.2	24,672	Berlin, Germany	4.8	Madrid, Spain	6.8
Bucharest, Romania	1.9	9,131	Barcelona, Spain	4.5	Berlin-Brandenburg, Germany	6.2
Hamburg, Germany	1.8	2,310	Milan, Italy	3.8	Frankfut Rhine-Main, Germany	5.9
Warsaw, Poland	1.7	3,258	Rotterdam–The Hague, Netherlands	3.3	Barcelona, Spain	5.3
Budapest, Hungary	1,7	3,570	Athens, Greece	3.2	Milan, Italy	4.3
Vienna, Austria	1.7	3,931	Naples, Italy	2.9	Athens, Greece	3.9

== Environment ==
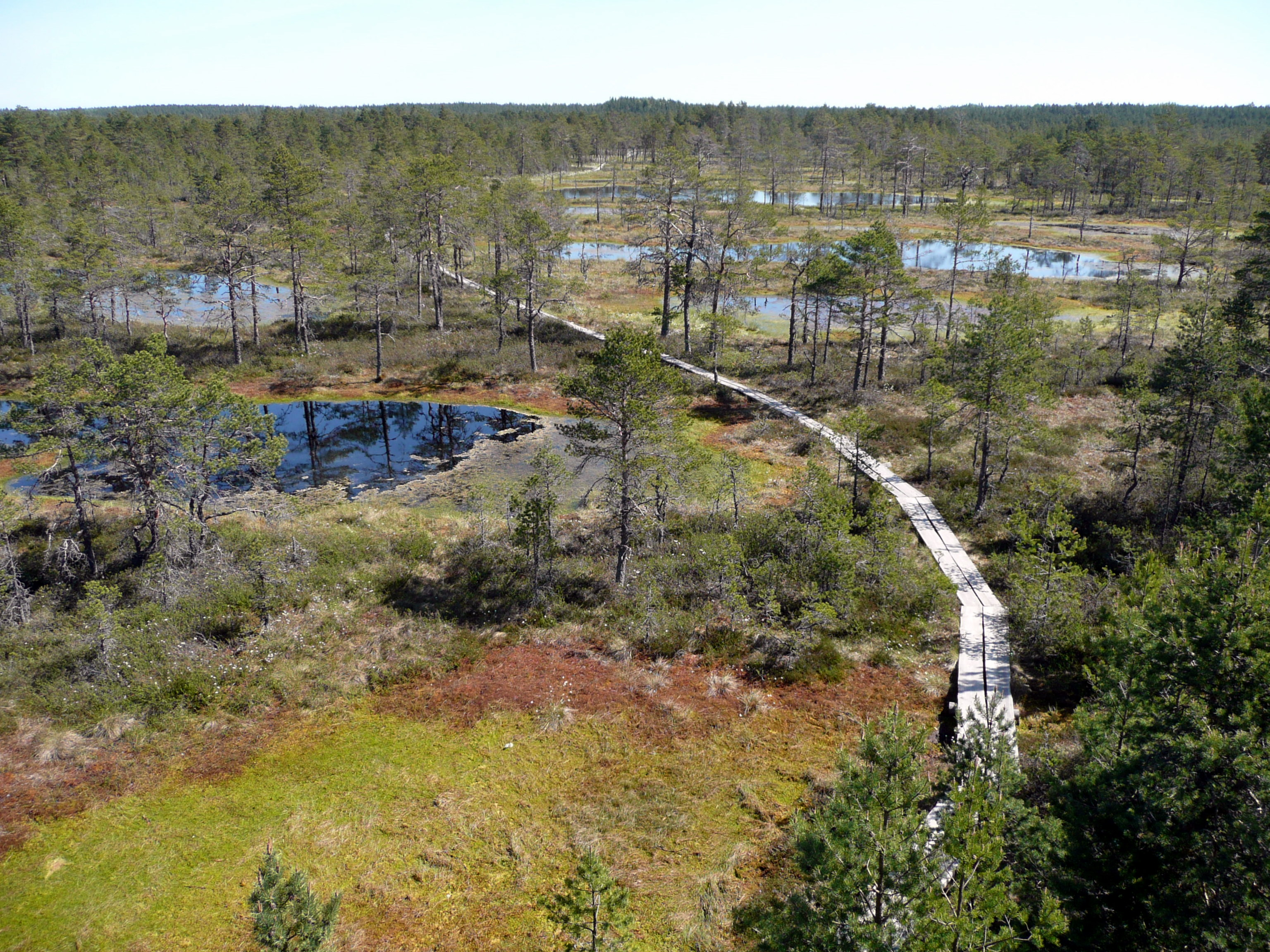
Viru Bog in Lahemaa National Park in Estonia, a protected habitat under the Habitats Directive

In 1957, when the EU was founded, it had no environmental policy or laws. Today, the EU has some of the most progressive environmental policies of any state in the world. The environmental policy of the EU has therefore developed in remarkable fashion in the past four decades. An increasingly dense network of legislation has emerged, which now extends to all areas of environmental protection, including: air pollution control, water protection, waste management, nature conservation, and the control of chemicals, biotechnology and other industrial risks. The Institute for European Environmental Policy estimates the body of EU environmental law amounts to well over 500 Directives, Regulations and Decisions. Environmental policy has thus become a core area of European politics.

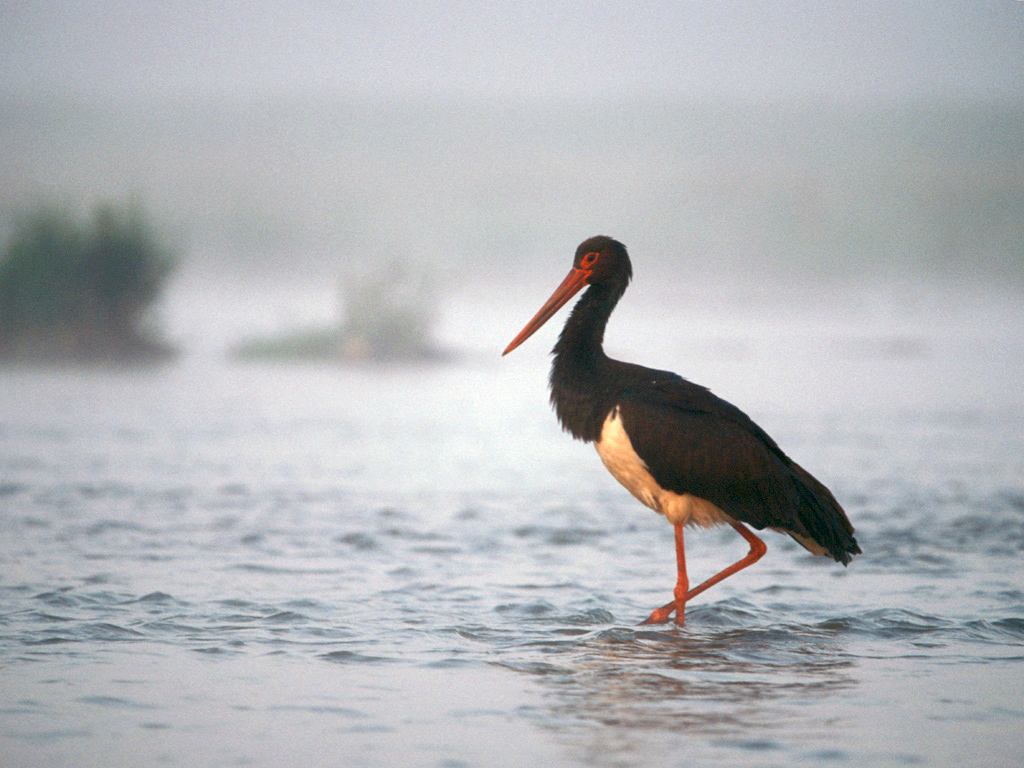
The black stork, an Annex A protected species under Regulation (EC) No. 338/97

Such dynamic developments are surprising in light of the legal and institutional conditions which existed in the late 1950s and 60s. Acting without any legislative authority, European policy-makers initially increased the EU's capacity to act by defining environmental policy as a trade problem. The most important reason for the introduction of a common environmental policy was the fear that trade barriers and competitive distortions in the Common Market could emerge due to the different environmental standards. However, in the course of time, EU environmental policy emerged as a formal policy area, with its own procedures. The legal basis of EU environmental policy was not more explicitly established until the introduction of the Single European Act in 1987.

Initially, EU environmental policy was rather introspective. More recently, however, the Union has considered global environmental governance. The role of the EU in securing the ratification and entry into force of the Kyoto Protocol in the face of US opposition is an example in this regard. This international dimension is reflected in the EU's Sixth Environmental Action Programme, which recognises that its strategic objectives can only be achieved if a series of key international environmental agreements are actively supported and properly implemented both at an EU level and worldwide. The entry into force of the Lisbon Treaty further strengthens the EU's global environmental leadership ambitions. The vast body of EU environmental law which now exists has played a vital role in improving habitat and species protection in Europe as well as contributed to improvements in air and water quality and waste management. However, significant challenges remain, both to meet existing EU targets and aspirations and to agree new targets and actions that will further improve the environment and the quality of life in Europe and beyond.

One of the top priorities of EU environmental policy is combating climate change. In 2007, member states agreed that the EU is to use 20% renewable energy in the future and that it has to reduce carbon dioxide emissions in 2020 by at least 20% compared to 1990 levels. This includes measures that in 2020, 10% of the overall fuel quantity used by cars and trucks in EU 27 should be running on renewable energy such as biofuels. This is considered to be one of the most ambitious moves of an important industrialised region to fight climate change. The EU recently adopted an emissions trading system to incorporate carbon emissions into the economy.

The European Green Capital is an annual award that is given to cities that focuses on the environment, energy efficiency and quality of life in urban areas to create smart city.

== See also ==
- Extreme points of the European Union
- Geographic centre of the European Union
- Geography of Europe
- Regions of Europe
