= List of extreme points of Finland =

Extreme points of Finland

This is a list of the extreme points of Finland, the points that are farther north, south, east or west than any other location, as well as points of highest and lowest elevation.

- Northernmost Point — Nuorgam, Utsjoki, Lapland at 70°05′32″N 27°57′20″E - also the northernmost point of the European Union
- Southernmost Point — Bogskär in the municipality of Kökar, Åland at 59°30′18″N 20°20′52″E
  - Inhabited: Utö
- Southernmost Point, Mainland — Tulliniemi, Hanko at 59°48′28.74″N 22°54′47.22″E
- Westernmost Point — Märket, Hammarland, Åland at 60°18′03″N 19°07′54″E
  - Inhabited: Västerö, Eckerö 60.2404°N 19.4744°E
  - Signilskär used to be permanently inhabited up the 1950s, but has now only a birdwatching station.
- Westernmost Point, Mainland — Kolttapahta, Enontekiö, Lapland at 69°03′36″N 20°32′52″E
- Easternmost Point — Virmajärvi, Ilomantsi at 62°54′30″N 31°35′12″E (also the easternmost point of the mainland European Union)
  - Inhabited: Möhkö (62°38′25″N 31°17′4″E). Hattuvaara (62°55′56″N 31°16′57″E) is sometimes cited as well.
  - There is also a public lean-to shelter at Lakonkangas, further east.

== Transportation ==
Only includes public transportation.

Airport:

- Northernmost: Ivalo Airport
- Southernmost: Mariehamn Airport
- Westernmost: Mariehamn Airport
- Easternmost: Joensuu Airport

Railway station:

- Northernmost: Kolari railway station
- Southernmost: Hanko railway station
- Westernmost: Vaasa railway station
- Easternmost: Uimaharju railway station

== Altitude ==
Highest:

- Halti fell, Enontekiö municipality, 1323,6 m at 69°18′30″N 21°15′50″E; however, the high point of Halti is located on the border with Norway, on a hill of a side peak that belongs to Norway; the main peak also belongs to Norway.
  - The highest fell entirely in Finland is Ridnitšohkka.

Lowest:

- Sea level, Baltic sea.
- Lowest mine: Pyhäsalmi Mine, Pyhäjärvi municipality 1444 m below ground.

== See also ==
- Extreme points of Earth
- Geography of Finland
