= Date and time notation in Finland =

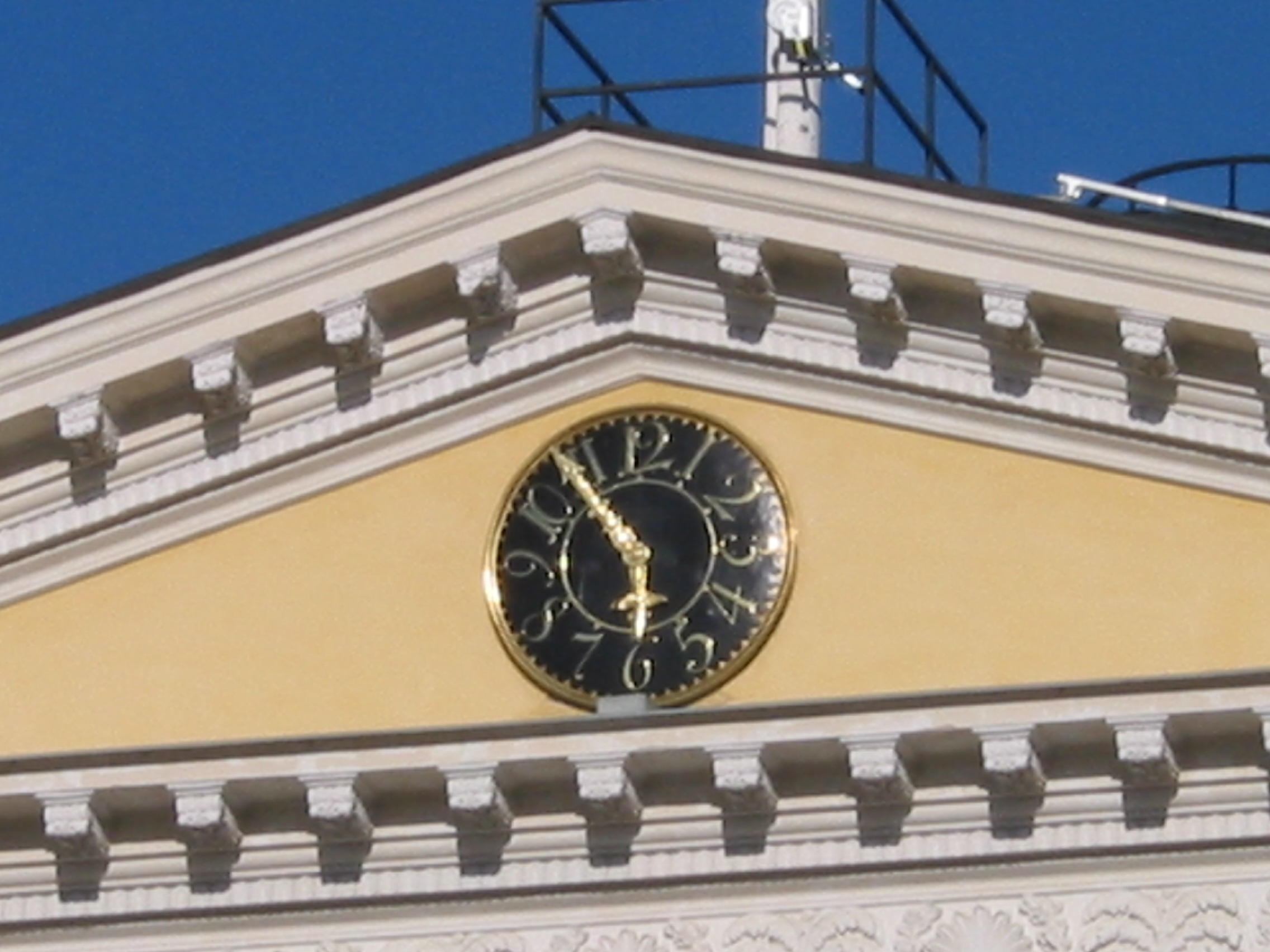
- The clock on the side of the Government Palace.
- Full date: 11. marraskuuta 2026 (in Finnish); 11 november 2026 (in Swedish)
- All-numeric date: 11.11.2026
- Time: 22.18

Date and time notation in Finland records the date using the day–month–year format (11. marraskuuta 2026). The time is written using the 24-hour clock (22.18); in spoken language and informal contexts, the 12-hour clock is more commonly adopted, but without using 'a.m.' or 'p.m.' suffixes.

== Date ==
In Finland, the usual way of writing dates in normal text is with the months spelled out. The format varies according to the language used. In Finnish, a full stop is placed after the day to indicate an ordinal: 31. toukokuuta 2002; furthermore, the month is in the partitive case, always marked by -ta. The month can also be written first, now in genitive case (the day päivä, 'day', is in essive case as above): toukokuun 31. päivänä 2002. In Swedish, the full stop is not used and the month is in nominative (without inflection): den 31 maj 2002.

The date can be preceded by the weekday (also lower case), in Finnish in essive case: perjantaina 31. toukokuuta 2002, fredagen den 31 maj 2002. The Finnish language has month names differing from most other languages; three letter abbreviations are not used in Finnish, and the months are not capitalised in either language (they are not considered proper names). In spoken Finnish in a context where it is clear people may say the short form of the month e.g. loka for lokakuu 'October', but never in formal writing as several months also can be times of the year e.g. joulukuu 'December' whereas joulu is yule or Christmastide; kesäkuu 'June' is similar to kesä 'summer'.

In the Sami languages (Inari Sámi, Northern Sámi and Skolt Sámi) the date can be given with the month first (month–day–year), but then spelt out in essive case: vyesimaanu 31. p. 2002, bearjadat, miessemannu 31. b. 2002, vue'ssmaan 31. p. 2002.

The all-numeric form for dates is in the order day–month–year, using a full stop as the separator (for example 31.5.2002). Years can be written with two digits (for example 31.5.02), provided there is no ambiguity. The numeric form is often used in lists, letterheads, etc. A form with a stroke is also common in Swedish, especially in handwritten text: 31/5 2002 or 31/5 -02. The weekday may be prepended: fredag 31/5 -02.

When the year is not specified, a trailing full stop is used, such as 31.5. for 31 May. This is particularly relevant in cases where the form could also be interpreted as a time of day: 20.10 represents 8:10 pm and 20.10. represents 20 October. Informally, the trailing full stop is often left out, but in turn the colon is used instead with times of day.

The ISO 8601 notation (2002-05-31) is not used in normal text in Finland, but it is understood and used in some other contexts (mostly machine-generated).

Numbering of weeks is used in Finland, and is simply expressed as in (viikko) 28; (vecka) 28 ('(week) 28') in both writing (abbreviated vk in Finnish and v. in Swedish) and speech, as well as on labels and in computer notation. The week begins with a Monday and week 1 is the week containing the year's first Thursday.

The names and abbreviations of days in Finnish are as follows:

| English | Finnish | Finnish abbreviation |
|---|---|---|
| Monday | maanantai | ma (/ maan.) |
| Tuesday | tiistai | ti (/ tiist.) |
| Wednesday | keskiviikko | ke (/kesk.) |
| Thursday | torstai | to (/torst.) |
| Friday | perjantai | pe (/perj.) |
| Saturday | lauantai | la |
| Sunday | sunnuntai | su (/sunn.) |

== Time ==
Time in Finland often uses the 12-hour clock in the spoken language and idiomatic expressions. 24-hour notation is used in writing, with a full point as the standardised and recommended separator (e.g. 15.07 or 8.27). However, a colon is almost exclusively used instead of a full point in computing environments, especially in Sámi languages. The conventions are the same for Finnish and Swedish. According to the Finnish standard, midnight is written as 24.00.

The following table shows times written in some common approaches 24-hour notation, and how each time is typically spoken in Finnish:

| 24-hour | Spoken in Finnish | Spoken in English |
|---|---|---|
| 00:00 | keskiyö | midnight |
| 00:00 | (nolla-nolla nolla-nolla) | double-o double-o |
| 00:00 | (kaksikymmentäneljä nolla-nolla) | twentyfour double-o |
| 06:05 | viisi yli kuusi (viittä yli kuusi) (viisi yli kuuden) (viittä yli kuuden) | five past six |
| 06:05 | viisi yli kuusi aamulla (viittä yli kuusi aamulla) (viisi yli kuuden aamulla) (viittä yli kuuden aamulla) | five past six in the morning |
| 06:05 | kuusi nolla viisi | six oh five |
| 09:18 | kahdeksantoista yli yhdeksän (kahdeksaatoista yli yhdeksän) | eighteen minutes past nine |
| 09:18 | kahdeksantoista yli yhdeksän aamulla (kahdeksaatoista yli yhdeksän aamulla) | eighteen minutes past nine in the morning |
| 09:18 | yhdeksän kahdeksantoista | nine eighteen |
| 11:15 | viittätoista yli yksitoista (viittätoista yli yhdentoista) | fifteen past eleven |
| 11:15 | viittätoista yli yksitoista aamulla (viittätoista yli yhdentoista aamulla) | fifteen past eleven in the morning |
| 11:15 | varttia yli yksitoista (varttia yli yhdentoista) | quarter past eleven |
| 11:15 | varttia yli yksitoista aamulla (varttia yli yhdentoista aamulla) | quarter past eleven in the morning |
| 11:15 | yksitoista viisitoista | eleven fifteen |
| 12:00 | keskipäivä | noon / midday |
| 12:00 | kaksitoista | twelve o'clock |
| 12:00 | (kaksitoista nolla-nolla) | 'twelve double-o' (twelve sharp) |
| 13:30 | puoli kaksi (puoli kahden) | half past two |
| 13:30 | puoli kaksi päivällä (puoli kahden päivällä) | half past two in the afternoon |
| 13:30 | kolmetoista kolmekymmentä | thirteen thirty |
| 17:38 | kaksikymmentäkaksi vaille viisi (kaksikymmentäkaksi vaille viiden) | twenty-two minutes to six |
| 17:38 | kaksikymmentäkaksi vaille viisi illalla (kaksikymmentäkaksi vaille viiden illalla) | twenty-two minutes to six in the evening |
| 17:38 | seitsemäntoista kolmekymmentäkahdeksan | seventeen thirty-eight |
| 18:00 | kuusi | six o'clock |
| 18:00 | kuusi illalla | six o'clock in the evening |
| 18:00 | kahdeksantoista | eighteen o'clock |
| 18:00 | (kahdeksantoista nolla-nolla) | eighteen double-o |
| 22:35 | kaksikymmentäviisi vaille yksitoista (kahtakymmentä vaille yksitoista) (kaksikymmentä vaille yksitoista) (kahtakymmentä vaille yhdentoista) | twenty-five to eleven |
| 22:35 | kaksikymmentäviisi vaille yksitoista illalla (kahtakymmentä vaille yksitoista illalla) (kaksikymmentä vaille yksitoista illalla) (kahtakymmentä vaille yhdentoista illalla) | twenty-five to eleven in the evening |
| 22:35 | kaksikymmentäkaksi kolmekymmentäviisi illalla | twenty thirty-five |
