= Lake Virmayarvi =

Lake in Finland and Russia

Virmayarvi/Virmajärvi
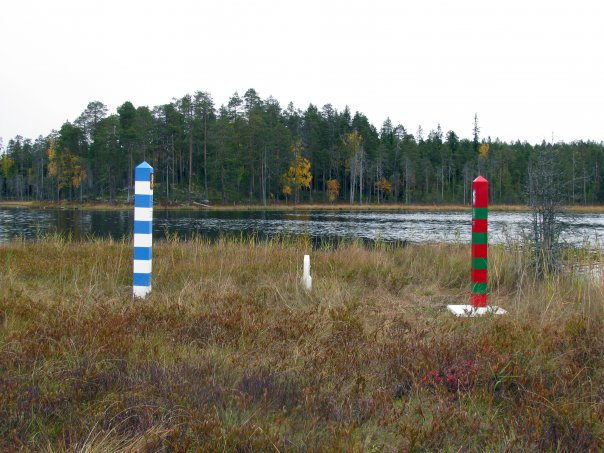
- Easternmost point of Finland, photo by a Russian member of the bilateral boundary re-demarcation commission

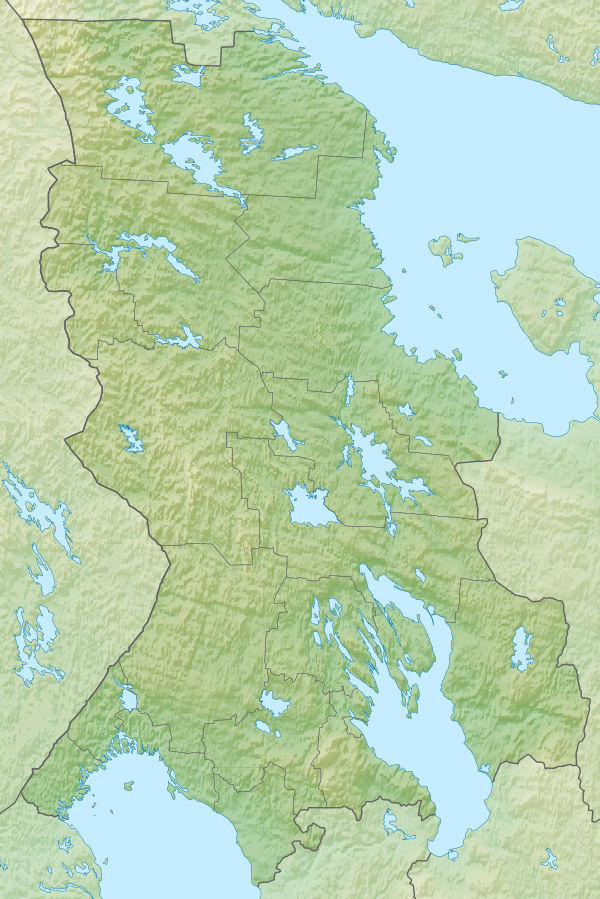
- Location within Karelia
- Coordinates: 62°54′31″N 31°35′11″E
- Basin countries: Finland, Russia
- Max. length: 1 km (0.62 mi)
- Surface area: 37.9 ha (94 acres)
- Surface elevation: 175.8 m (577 ft)

Lake Virmayarvi (Russian: Вирмаярви, romanized: Virmayarvi; Finnish: Virmajärvi) is a small (1-kilometre (0.6 mi) long) lake straddling the border between Finland (Ilomantsi municipality) and Russia (Suoyarvsky District, Republic of Karelia). The lake has an area of 37.9 hectares (94 acres), of which 13 ha (32 acres) belongs to Finland and 24.9 ha (62 acres) to Russia. Its surface elevation is 175.8 metres (577 ft) above sea level.

The lake is located 16 km (9.9 mi) east of the village of Hattuvaara. The easternmost point of Finland and of the continental European Union is located on an island in the lake. A national border has passed through Virmajärvi since 1621, when the Swedish–Russian border was demarcated following the Treaty of Stolbovo of 1617. The current border was established in 1940 after the Moscow Peace Treaty.
