= Extreme points of the Commonwealth of Nations =

This is a list of the extreme points of the Commonwealth of Nations — the points that are farther north, south, east or west, or higher or lower in elevation than any other location.

== Latitude ==
The northernmost point in the Commonwealth is in the far north of Canada. Cape Columbia, on Ellesmere Island, in the territory of Nunavut lies at 83°08″41′N. Nunavut is a full part of Canada, which is an active member of the Commonwealth, making its position as the northernmost point uncontroversial.

The southernmost point in the Commonwealth depends on whether the Antarctic claims of three of the Commonwealth's members – Australia, New Zealand, and the United Kingdom – are counted. If so, the southernmost point is the South Pole (by definition, 90°S), where those three claims (and those of other, non-Commonwealth, countries) meet. However, these claims are generally not recognised, except by some or all other claimants to Antarctica. If Antarctic claims are not included, Thule Island, in the British overseas territory of South Sandwich Islands, lies farthest south, at 59°27″00′S. These, still, are overseas territories of a Commonwealth member. Including only integral parts of members, the most southern point is Jacquemart Island, New Zealand, at 52°37″10′S.

== Longitude ==
Using lines of longitude (rather than the International Date Line), the easternmost and westernmost points in the Commonwealth are the same, as the 180th meridian goes through three Fijian islands, as well as New Zealand's Antarctic Ross Dependency. The three Fijian islands are Vanua Levu (far eastern peninsula, near Nambouono), Taveuni (centre of the island), and Rabi (western tip).

Using the International Date Line yields different results for the most easternmost and westernmost points, as it is drawn such that all Commonwealth members lie either to the west or east of it – and not across it – to simplify administration. In this case, the westernmost point is on Banaba Island, in Kiribati, at 169°32′13″E. The easternmost point is on Niue, a state in free association with New Zealand, at 169°52′11″W. Including only territories that are themselves directly members of the Commonwealth, the westernmost point would be on Vatoa, Fiji, at 178°15'W.

== Elevation ==
The highest point in the Commonwealth by elevation above sea level is the summit of K2, which lies at 35°52′57″N 76°30′48″E, in Pakistan or on the border between Pakistan and China. At 8,611 metres (28,251 ft), it is the world's second-tallest mountain. The most-prominent peak in the Commonwealth is Kilimanjaro (in Tanzania), which has a prominence of 5,885 metres (19,308 ft), making it the fourth-most prominent peak in the world. The result is significantly different as K2 is only the 22nd-most prominent peak in the world, due to its proximity to Mount Everest.

The lowest point in the Commonwealth by elevation below sea level is the shore of Lake Eyre, which lies at 28°22′S 137°22′E, in Australia. It lies approximately 15 metres (49 ft) below sea level.

== See also ==
- Extreme points of Earth
- Extreme points of the European Union
- List of countries by highest point
- List of countries by lowest point
