= Cape Greco =

Headland in southeastern Cyprus

Coordinates: 35°00′N 34°01′E

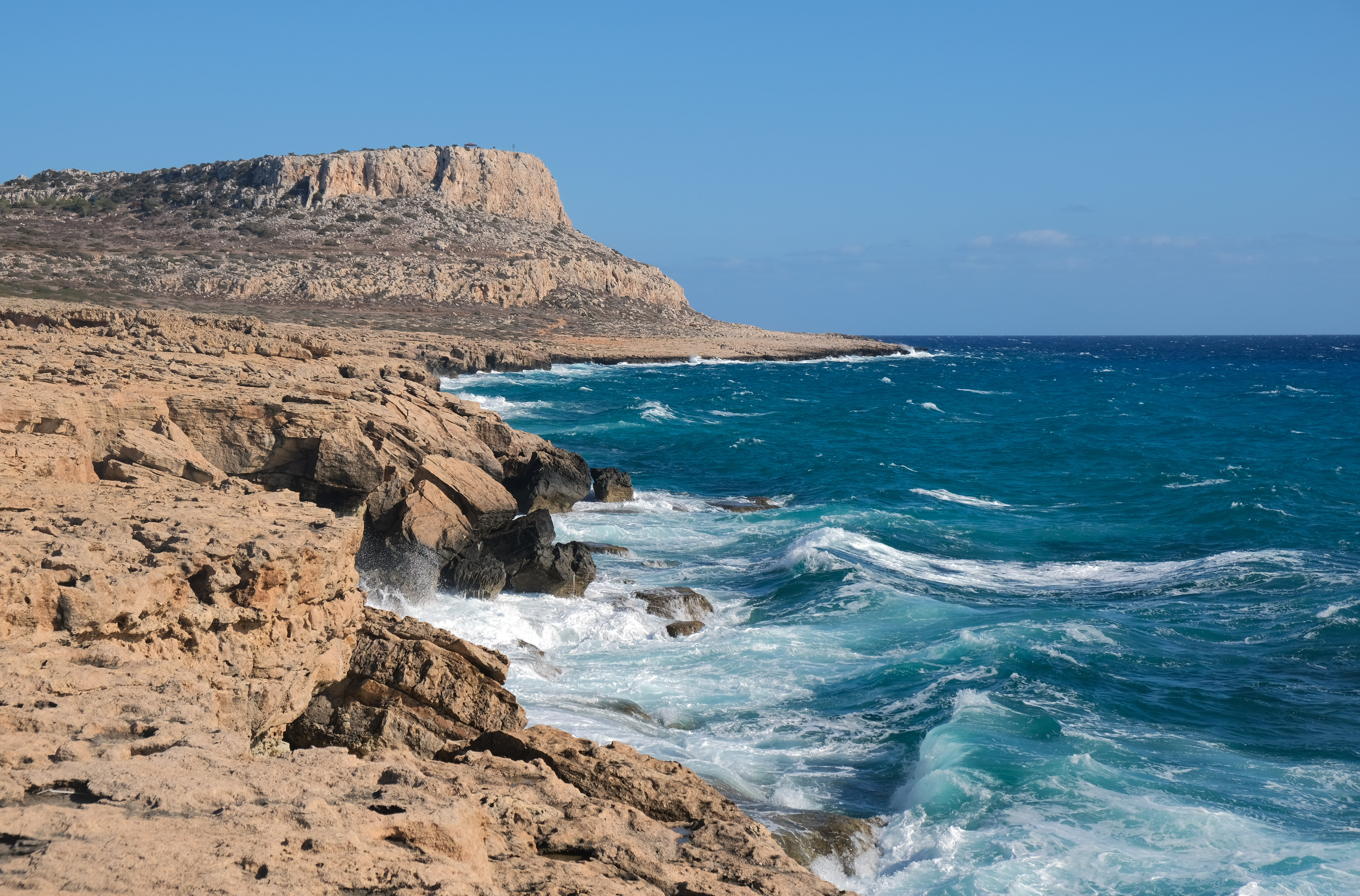
Cape Greco

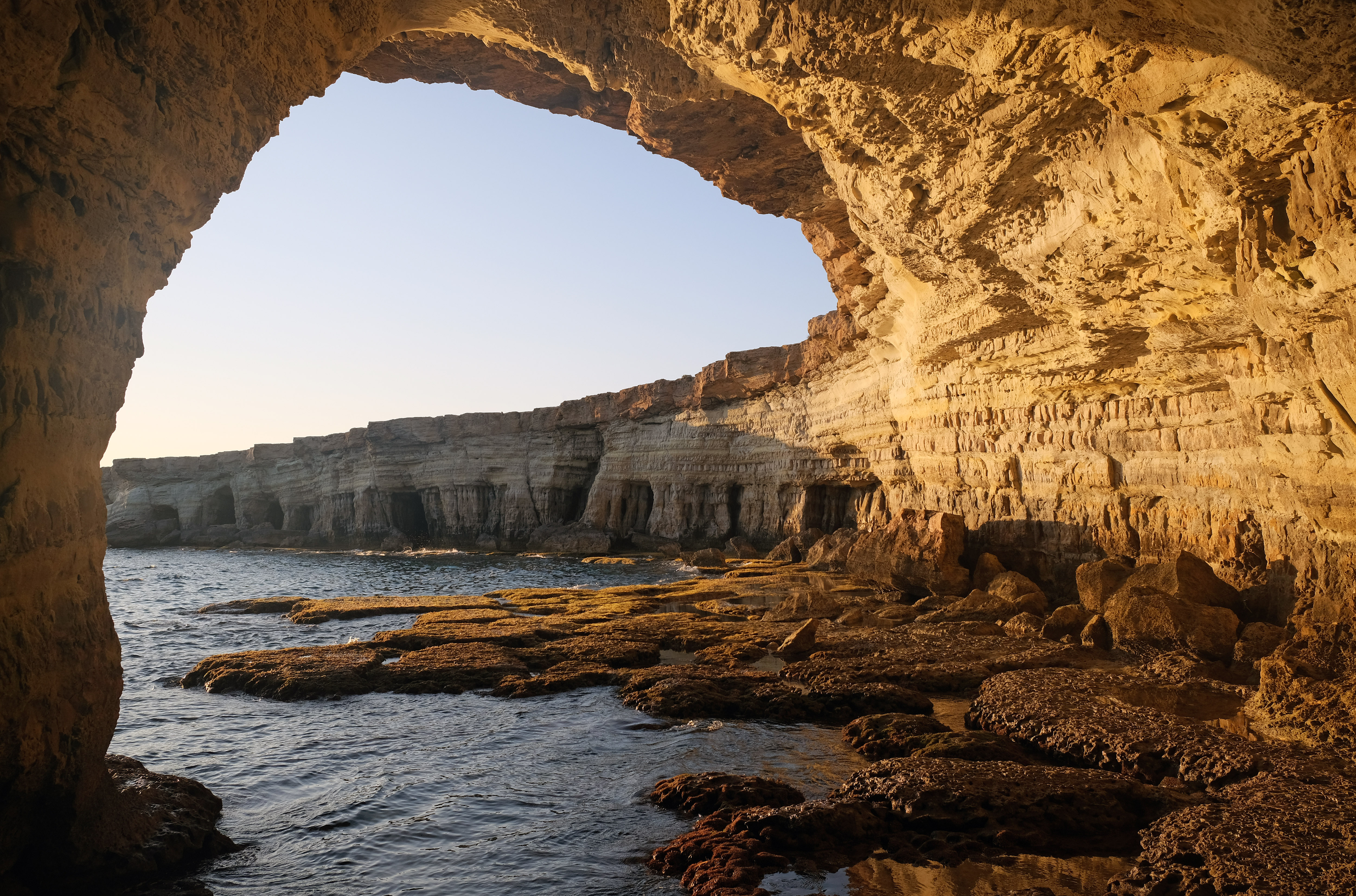
Sea caves at Cape Greco

Cape Greco, also known as Capo Greco (Italian for "Greek cape"; Greek: Κάβο Γκρέκο), is a headland in the southeastern part of the island of Cyprus. It is at the southern end of Famagusta Bay and forms part of Ayia Napa Municipality. It lies between the towns of Ayia Napa and Protaras, both tourist resorts, and is visited by tourists for its natural environment. It is the easternmost point of both the government-controlled areas of the Republic of Cyprus and, de facto, of the European Union, when excluding the outermost regions. According to local legend, it is also the home of the 'Ayia Napa sea monster'.

The cape was known as Cape Pedalion (Greek: Πηδάλιον) in antiquity. According to Strabo the trapezoidal hill lying above it was sacred to Aphrodite.

The "fairy caves" refer to the spectacular Sea Caves (sometimes called "Palaces") located along the coast of Cape Greco National Forest Park. Carved naturally into the striking limestone cliffs, these caves offer a magical, otherworldly coastal landscape.

== Important Bird Area ==
A 1209 the area encompassing the cape has been designated an Important Bird Area (IBA) by BirdLife International because it is a key migration site for large numbers of raptors and other birds. It forms a migratory bottleneck for red-footed falcons, pallid harriers, honey buzzards and common kestrels, as well as supporting breeding populations of Cyprus wheatears, Cyprus warblers and black francolins. Although the cape is a National Forest Park under the administration of the Forestry Department of the Cyprus Ministry of the Interior, the birds there are threatened by illegal trapping.

== Transmitter ==
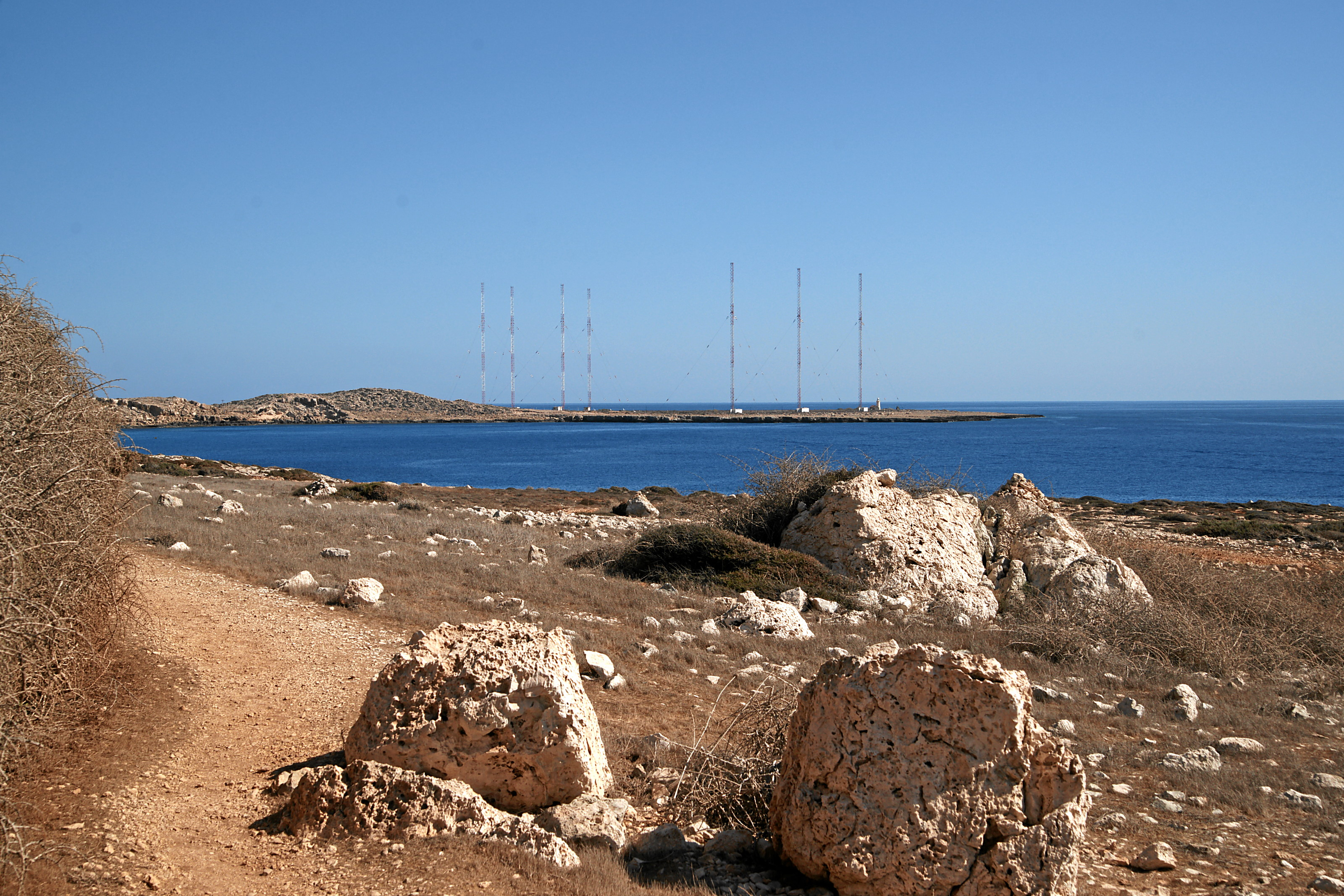
Antennas on Cape Greco as in October 2021

Cape Greco was the location of a powerful mediumwave broadcasting station operated by Radio Monte Carlo; it carried the French- and Arabic-language programme of Radio Monte Carlo Middle East / RMC Moyen-Orient aimed at audiences in the Middle East and Northern Africa. In the early morning hours and, for some years, late at night, it carried programmes from TWR in Arabic, Armenian, and Persian.

The transmitter site was constructed in the early 1970s and began operation in 1973, carrying the French- and Arabic-language programmes of Radio Radio Monte Carlo Middle East / RMC Moyen-Orient on 1233 kHz with 600 kW. After 1974, early morning and late night hours were used to transmit programmes of Trans World Radio targeted at the Middle East. For financial reasons and the declining importance of mediumwave, the RMC Moyen-Orient transmissions were terminated on 31 December 2019.

The U.S. interest in a broadcasting facility to cover the Middle East led to a contract to use the reserve antenna, and a second transmitter was installed in 1992. Since 2002, this transmitter has carried the Arabic-language programme of Radio Sawa, founded by the U.S. government. From the initial frequency of 981 kHz, it had to move to 990 kHz due to interference with ERT broadcasting from Athens. The 600 kW transmissions ceased on 1 July 2019.

In early November 2021, both antennas were demolished, and a nature reserve information centre was to take their place.

== See also ==
- Geography of Cyprus
