= Ostrobothnia Chamber of Commerce =

Finnish business organization

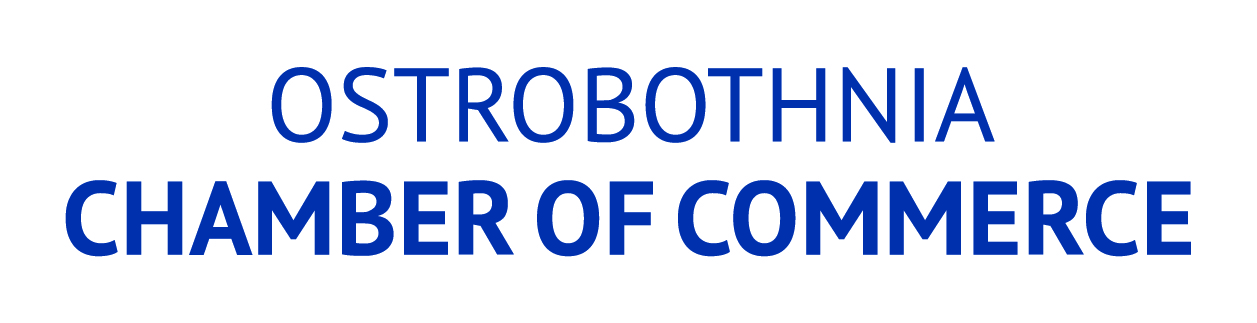
- Founded: 1917
- Purpose: Business advocacy
- Location(s): Vaasa, Kokkola, and Jakobstad, Finland
- Region served: Ostrobothnia and Central Ostrobothnia
- Method: Lobbying, public relations
- CEO: Paula Erkkilä
- Website: www.ostro.chamber.fi/en/front-page/

The Ostrobothnia Chamber of Commerce (Finnish: Pohjanmaan kauppakamari; Swedish: Österbottens handelskammare) is a business organization and one of the 19 regional Chambers of Commerce in Finland. It represents over 1000 companies from a variety of fields including trade, services, construction and private services in the Ostrobothnia and Central Ostrobothnia regions in Finland. The organization is headed by CEO Paula Erkkilä who succeeded Juha Häkkinen on 1st October, 2021. In 2017, it was awarded the Chamber of Commerce of the year in Finland.

== History ==
The Ostrobothnia Chamber of Commerce is one of the oldest and largest Chambers of Commerce in Finland established in 1917. It was the 4th Chamber of Commerce from the nineteen Finland Chambers of Commerce established.

== Key activities ==
The Chamber builds a strong network among members as well as manage their interests. These key activities evolves around enhancing the positive direct network effects in serving their customers and adding value. Ostrobothnia Chamber of Commerce also delivers qualification in the field of business. The Chamber's range of business services include:

- Lobbying: The entity also act as a representative of its members in lobbying for their interests in terms of legislation, taxes, the business environment and in international front.
- Networking and learning events: Organizes network events for members to network with key decision makers as well as gives members access to a global network of Chambers of Commerce. Furthermore, it organizes training programs for member and non-member companies on topical issues in finance and human resource management.
- International trade documentation: Ostrobothnia Chamber issues and validates various documents e.g. foreign trade documents, certificates of origin, etc.
- Public Relations: The Chamber also serve as a communication tool in promoting the member companies and the Ostrobothnia and Central Ostrobothnia regions through the Coastline Magazine and CB-Journal of Commerce.
- Policy consultations: Chamber's policy works focus on developing the Ostrobothnia and Central Ostrobothnia regions' infrastructure and transport, promoting competitiveness and improving local governance. Other policy works like 'employ the youth campaign' (palkkaanuori-kampanja) are geared toward employment creation.

== Publications ==
The Ostrobothnia Chamber of Commerce has two main publications: the CB-Journal and Coastline Magazine.

- CB-Journal: CB is an online publication of the Ostrobothnia Chamber of Commerce. It is published four times annually; two of which are in prints. The publication highlights current companies and interesting entrepreneurial personalities. Prints are distributed to over 3000 companies in the operating regions.
- Coastline: Coastline is a premier magazine published biannually by the Ostrobothnia Chamber of Commerce. The magazine generally presents export companies and their success stories. The latest edition was released in April, 2020.
