= Centre for Metrology and Accreditation =

National metrology institute of Finland

The Centre for Metrology
- Abbreviation: MIKES (VTT MIKES)
- Formation: 1991
- Type: National Metrology Institute, part of VTT.
- Headquarters: Espoo, Finland
- Region served: Metrology and accreditation
- Website: www.mikes.fi

From the beginning of 2015, the Centre for Metrology (MIKES) (Finnish: Mittatekniikan keskus; Swedish: Mätteknikcentralen) formerly the Centre for Metrology and Accreditation has been part of VTT Technical Research Centre of Finland Ltd. As the National Metrology Institute of Finland, MIKES is responsible for the implementation and development of the national measurement standards system and realisation of the SI units in Finland. MIKES designates other National Standards Laboratories in Finland. Moreover, MIKES performs research in metrology, i.e., in measurement science. MIKES’s customers include both Finnish and international companies as well as the public sector. Other national metrology institutes are for example PTB (Germany), NPL (UK), (Japan), NIST (USA), and Główny Urząd Miar (Poland). As a part of VTT MIKES operates under the administrative domain of the Ministry of Employment and the Economy.

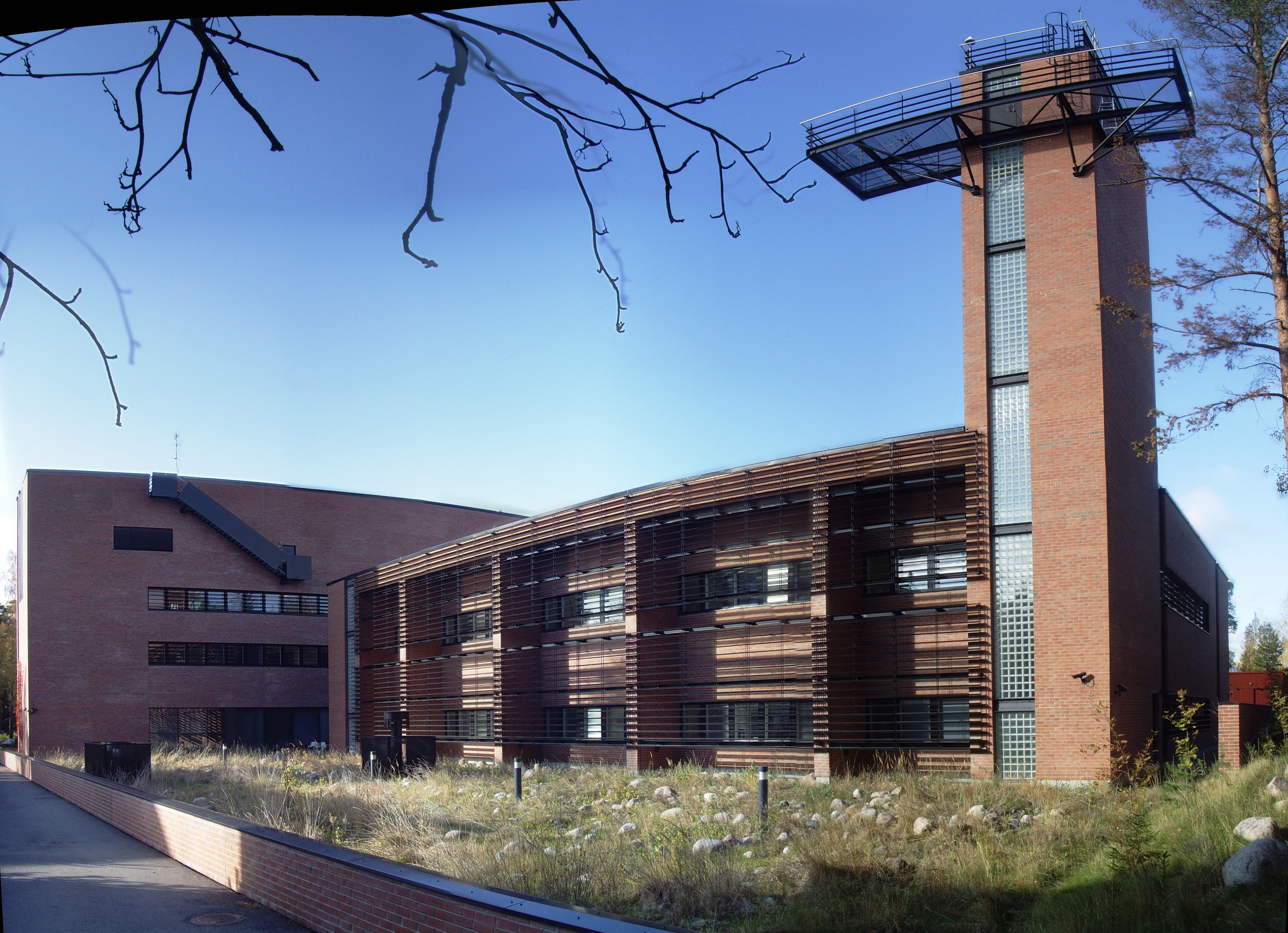
The MIKES building in Otaniemi, Espoo 60°10′49″N 24°49′33″E

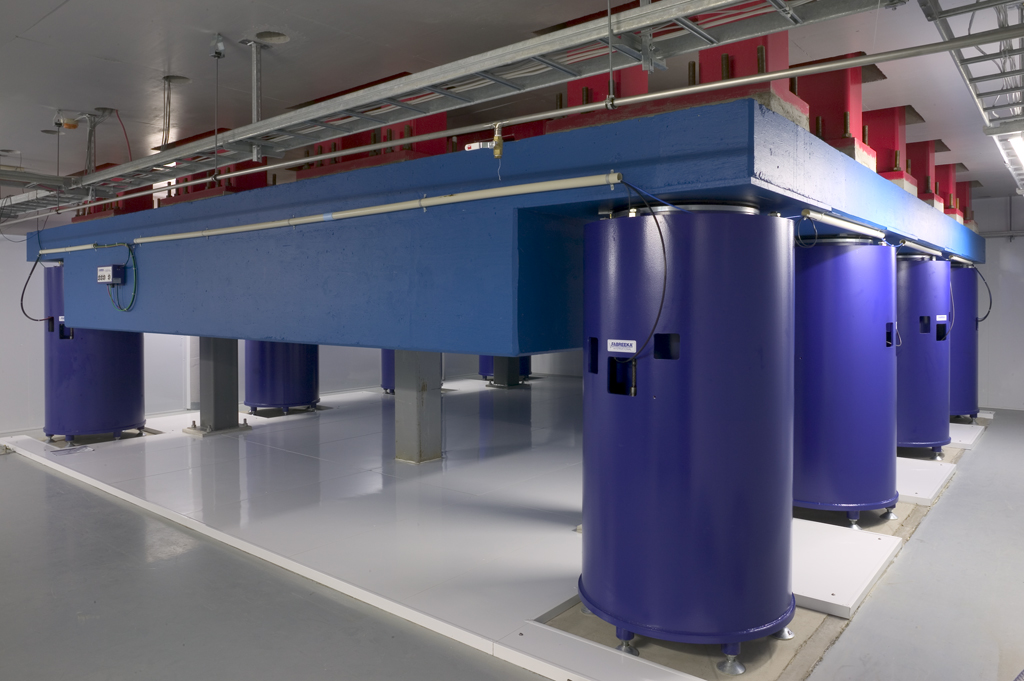
Laboratory vibration damping. The mass of the blue concrete slab is 140 000 kg.

== Current operations ==
MIKES was founded in 1991, and until 2015 it included two separate operational activities: MIKES Metrology and FINAS (Finnish Accreditation Service). In the beginning of 2015, the metrology activities of MIKES merged with VTT to form VTT Technical Research Centre of Finland Ltd. Currently, MIKES is a research area at VTT assigned to act as the National Metrology Institute of Finland. The main tasks of MIKES are to realize the SI-units, to perform high level research in metrology, to develop measurement techniques for the industry and society, and to offer calibration, expert and educational services.

Regarding legal metrology, MIKES collaborates with the Finnish Safety and Chemicals Agency, Tukes. Tukes ensures that measurement equipment used for pricing products in commerce, e.g., grocery store scales and fuel dispensers at gas stations, satisfy the legal requirements.

In 2005 MIKES moved to a new building that was designed with the special needs of measurement science in mind. Temperature stability, vibration damping and shielding against electromagnetic interference are state of the art.

The MIKES building is located in the south of Finland, in Otaniemi, Espoo (see the map). MIKES also has activities on the premises of a former UPM paper mill in the town of Kajaani (see the map). In addition, MIKES has several contract laboratories (designated institutes, DI) that perform calibrations within their own fields of expertise, including the Finnish Environment Institute SYKE, the Finnish Meteorological Institute, the Radiation and Nuclear Safety Authority STUK, the Aalto University, and the Finnish Geodetic Institute.

== Research ==
MIKES’s strategic research areas are quantum metrology, spectroscopy, nano and micro metrology, environment, and energy. MIKES has an active role within the European Metrology Programme for Innovation and Research EMPIR of EURAMET and in Finnish research projects. MIKES cooperates e.g. with European metrology institutes, with the scientific community in the Otaniemi area, and with organizations within the joint centre CEMIS in the Kajaani area.

== Directors ==
- Ulla Lähteenmäki 1991–2001
- Timo Hirvi 2001–2015
- Heikki Isotalo 2015–2016
- Mikko Merimaa 2016–2018
- Martti Heinonen 2018–
