= Extreme points of the European Union =

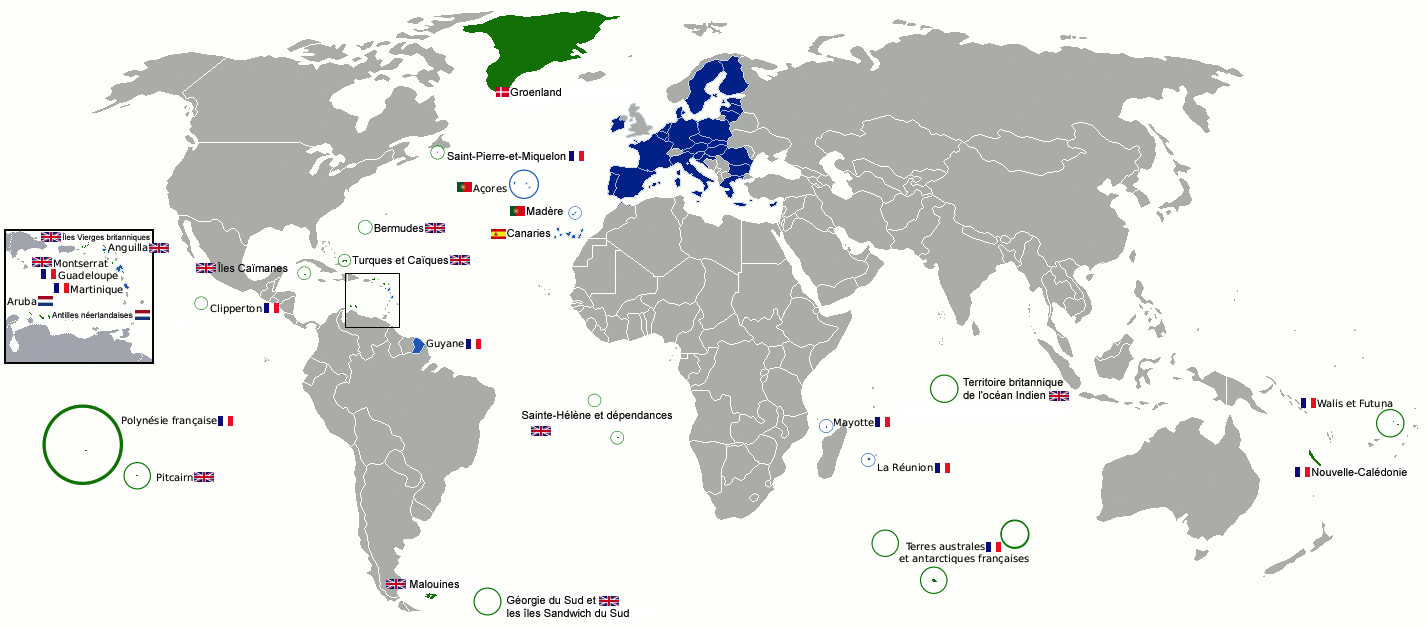
European Union and the UK with overseas territories

This is a list of the extreme points of the European Union – the points that are farther north, south, east or west than any other location.

== Overall ==
- North: Nuorgam, Finland
- South: Pointe de Langevin, Saint-Joseph, Réunion, France (21° 23′ 20″ S)
- West: Pointe du Canonnier, Saint-Martin, France (63° 08′ W)
- East: Pointe des Cascades, Sainte-Rose, Réunion, France (55° 50′ 11″ E)

Note that most overseas territories of EU member countries are not part of the European Union, and therefore do not count here. All of these territories are as well part of Eurozone and represent its extreme points.

== In Europe, not including overseas territories ==
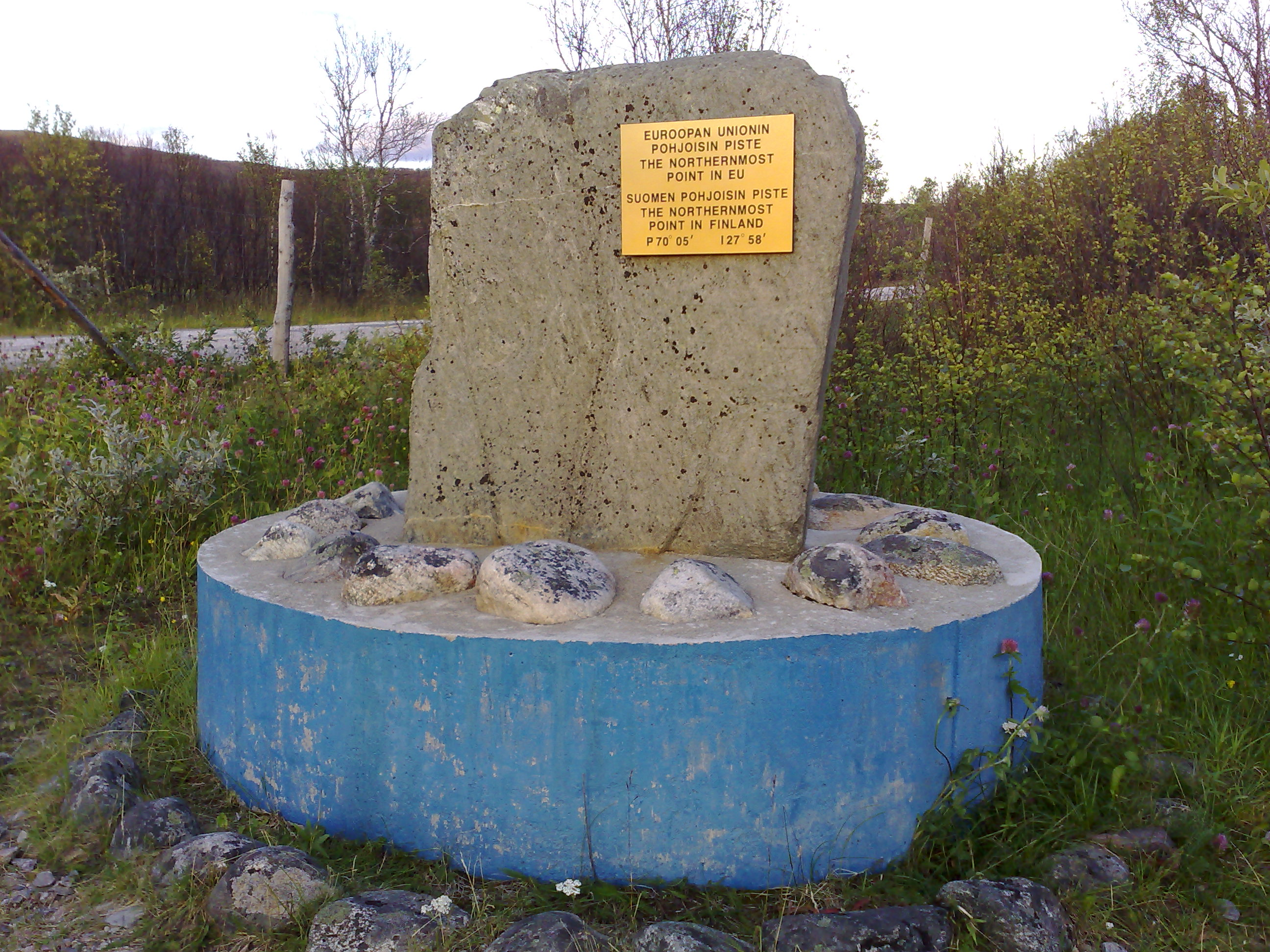
Border marker at the road near the northernmost point of the European Union near Nuorgam, Finland. There is a marker also at the exact point at the river.

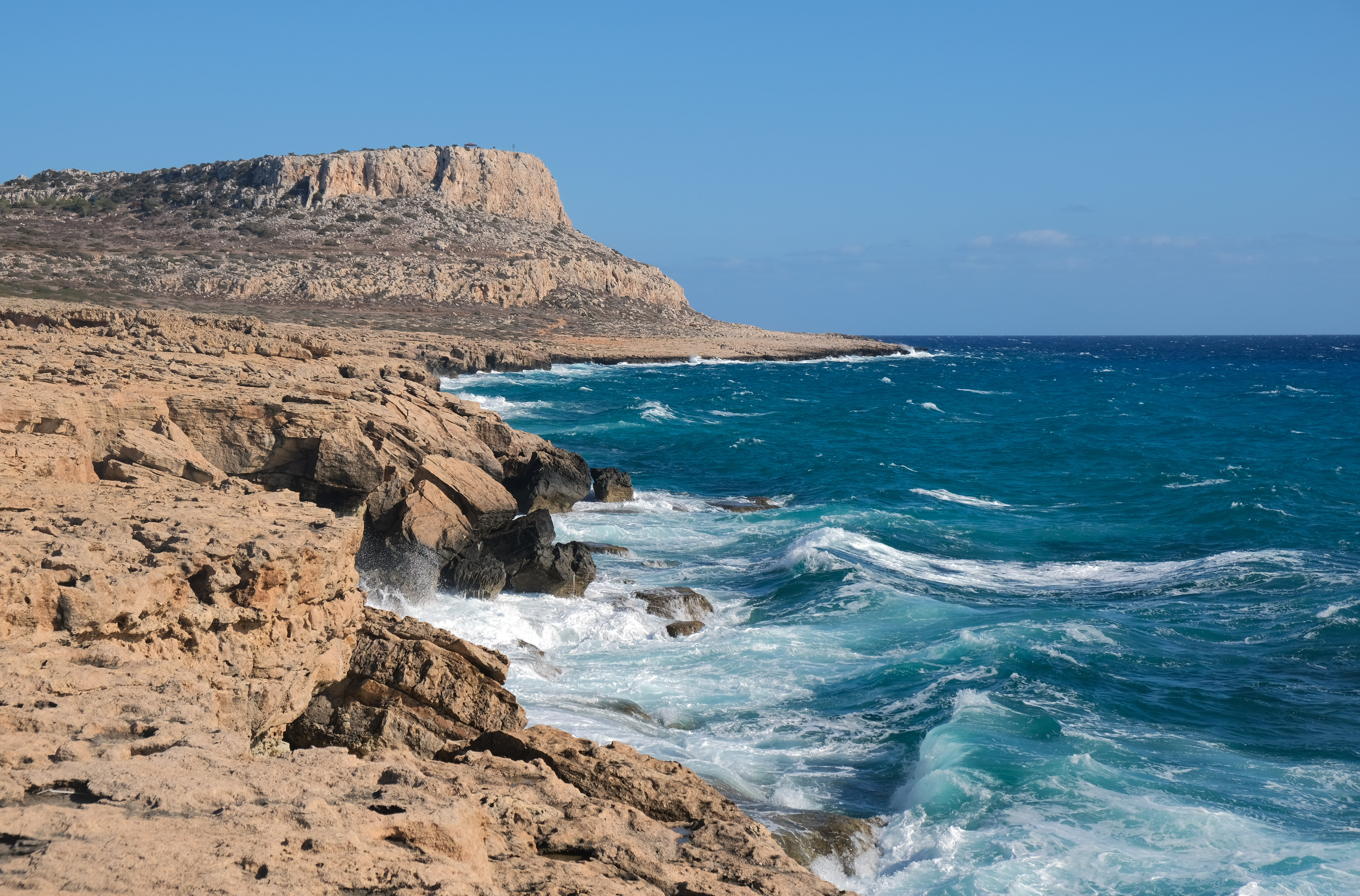
Cape Greco, Cyprus

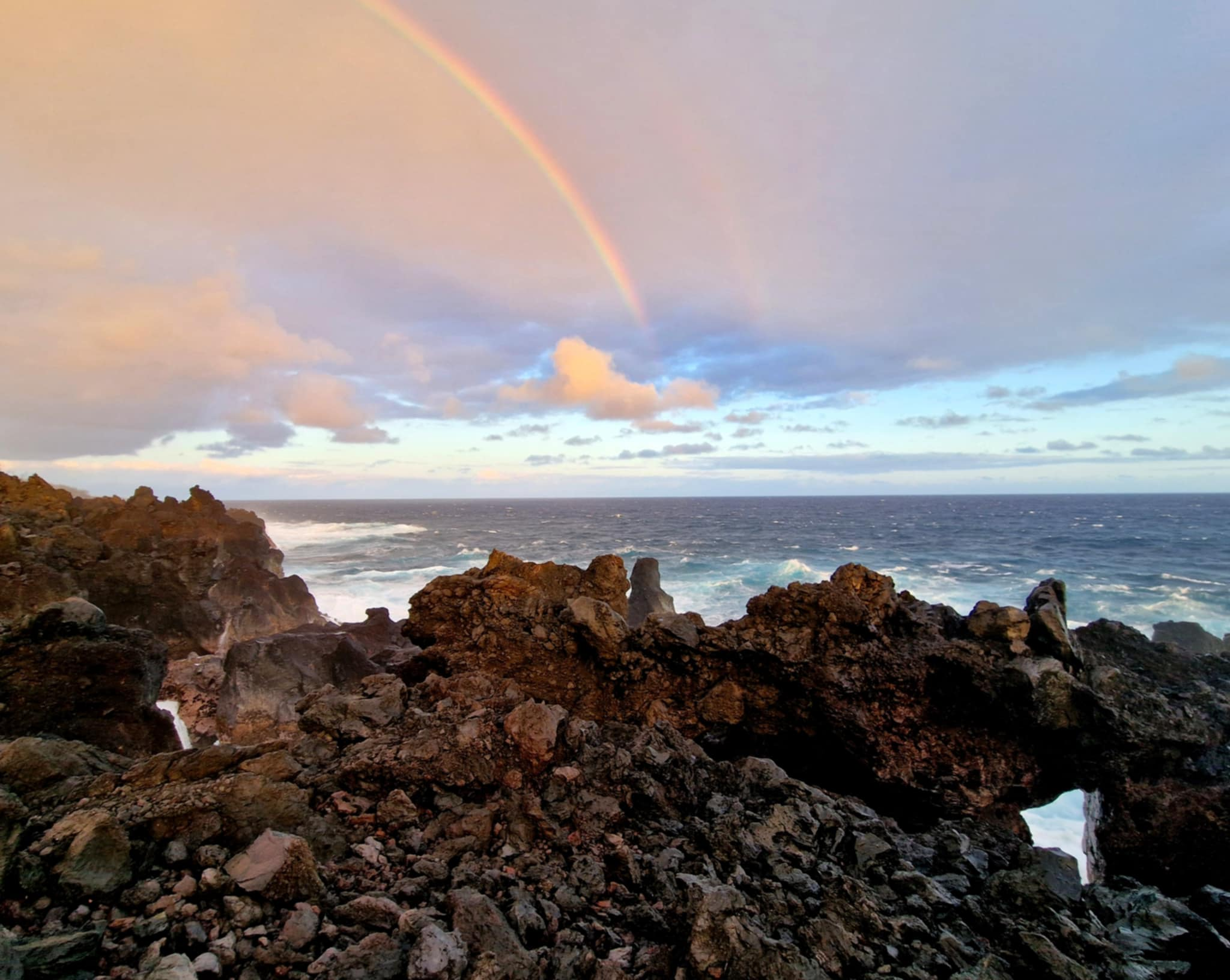
Pointe de Langevin, Réunion

- North: Nuorgam, Finland (70° 5′ 30″ N)
- South: La Restinga, Canary Islands, Spain (27° 38′ N)
- West: Monchique Islet, Azores Islands, Portugal (31°16′30″W)
- East: Rizokarpaso, Cyprus de jure (34° 36′ E)

or Cape Greco, Ayia Napa, Cyprus de facto (34° 5′ E)

== In mainland Europe ==
Only including the European continent proper, i.e. mainland of the 24 member states excluding islands such as Cyprus, Malta or Ireland.

- North: Nuorgam, Finland
- South: Punta de Tarifa, Spain (36° 0′ 15″ N)
- West: Cabo da Roca, Portugal (9° 30′ W)
- East: Virmajärvi, Finland (31° 35′ E)
- Southeastern: Rezovo, Bulgaria (41°59′N 28°1′E)
- Southwestern: Cape St. Vincent, Portugal (37°1′30″N 8°59′40″W)
- Northwestern: Tripoint between Sweden and the Norwegian provinces of Nordland and Troms, near the town of Narvik, Norway (37°1′30″N 8°59′40″W)
- Northeastern: Same as the Northernmost point: Nuorgam, Finland

== In the Schengen Area ==
- North: Nuorgam, Finland
- South: La Restinga, Canary Islands, Spain (27° 38′ N)
- West: Monchique Islet, Azores Islands, Portugal (31°16′30″W)
- East: Virmajärvi, Finland (31° 35′ 11″E)

== Altitude ==
- The EU's highest peak is Mont Blanc in the Graian Alps, 4,810.45 metres (15,782 ft) above sea level.
- The lowest point (man-made) in the EU is Tagebau Hambach, 293 m (961 ft) below sea level, Niederzier, North Rhine-Westphalia,
- The lowest natural point in the EU is Étang de Lavalduc in southeastern Metropolitan France, at 10 m (33 ft) below sea level.

== See also ==
- Geographic centre of the European Union
- Geography of the European Union
- Extreme points of Europe
- Extreme points of Earth
- Extreme points of the Commonwealth of Nations
