= List of tz database time zones =

The tz database partitions the world into regions where local clocks all show the same time. This map was made by combining version 2026c with OpenStreetMap data, using open-source software.

This is a list of time zones from release 2026f of the tz database.

== Legend ==
=== Type ===
- Canonical – The primary, preferred zone name.
- Link – An alternative name (alias) which links to a canonical zone.
- Link^{†} – A standard Link (as above). The dagger symbol (†) signifies that the zone was canonical in a previous version of the database. Historical data for such zones is still preserved in the source code, but it is not included when compiling the database with standard options.

=== UTC offset ===
Offsets of Standard Time (SDT) and Daylight Saving Time (DST) from UTC are noted in hours and minutes.

For zones in which Daylight Saving is not observed, the DST offset shown in this table is a simple duplication of the SDT offset.

The offsets from UTC are based on the current or upcoming database rules. This table does not attempt to document any of the historical data which resides in the database.

In Ireland, what Irish law designates as "standard time" is observed during the summer, with clocks turned one hour ahead of UTC. The SDT column shows the offset from UTC during the winter, even in Ireland, where that is referred to as "winter time", and the DST column shows the offset from UTC during the summer, even in Ireland, where that is referred to as "standard time".

=== Time zone abbreviations ===
Time zone abbreviations for both Standard Time and Daylight Saving Time are shown exactly as they appear in the database. See strftime and its %Z field.
Some zone records use three- or four-letter abbreviations that are tied to physical time zones; others use numeric UTC offsets.

In Ireland, what Irish law designates as "standard time" is observed during the summer, with clocks turned one hour ahead of UTC. The SDT column shows the abbreviation used during the winter, even in Ireland, and the DST column shows the abbreviation used during the summer, which is IST, where the S in IST stands for Standard, not Summer.

== List ==
Legend: Canonical Link

| Country code(s) | TZ identifier | Embedded comments | Type | UTC offset ±hh:mm | | Time zone abbreviations | | Source file | Notes |
| Country code(s) | TZ identifier | Embedded comments | Type | SDT | DST | SDT | DST | Source file | Notes |
|---|---|---|---|---|---|---|---|---|---|
| | Etc/GMT+12 | | Canonical | −12:00 | −12:00 | -12 | | etcetera | Sign is intentionally inverted. See the Etc area description. |
| | Etc/GMT+11 | | Canonical | −11:00 | −11:00 | -11 | | etcetera | Sign is intentionally inverted. See the Etc area description. |
| NU | Pacific/Niue | | Canonical | −11:00 | −11:00 | -11 | | australasia | |
| AS, UM | Pacific/Pago_Pago | Midway | Canonical | −11:00 | −11:00 | SST | | australasia | |
| AS | US/Samoa | | Link | −11:00 | −11:00 | SST | | backward | Link to Pacific/Pago_Pago |
| AS | Pacific/Samoa | | Link | −11:00 | −11:00 | SST | | backward | Link to Pacific/Pago_Pago |
| UM | Pacific/Midway | Midway Islands | Link^{†} | −11:00 | −11:00 | SST | | backward | Link to Pacific/Pago_Pago |
| | Etc/GMT+10 | | Canonical | −10:00 | −10:00 | -10 | | etcetera | Sign is intentionally inverted. See the Etc area description. |
| US | Pacific/Honolulu | Hawaii | Canonical | −10:00 | −10:00 | HST | | northamerica | |
| US | US/Hawaii | | Link | −10:00 | −10:00 | HST | | backward | Link to Pacific/Honolulu |
| UM | Pacific/Johnston | | Link^{†} | −10:00 | −10:00 | HST | | backward | Link to Pacific/Honolulu |
| | HST | | Link^{†} | −10:00 | −10:00 | HST | | backward | Link to Pacific/Honolulu |
| CK | Pacific/Rarotonga | | Canonical | −10:00 | −10:00 | -10 | | australasia | |
| PF | Pacific/Tahiti | Society Islands | Canonical | −10:00 | −10:00 | -10 | | australasia | |
| US | America/Adak | Alaska – western Aleutians | Canonical | −10:00 | −09:00 | HST | HDT | northamerica | |
| US | US/Aleutian | | Link | −10:00 | −09:00 | HST | HDT | backward | Link to America/Adak |
| US | America/Atka | | Link | −10:00 | −09:00 | HST | HDT | backward | Link to America/Adak |
| PF | Pacific/Marquesas | Marquesas Islands | Canonical | −09:30 | −09:30 | -0930 | | australasia | |
| | Etc/GMT+9 | | Canonical | −09:00 | −09:00 | -09 | | etcetera | Sign is intentionally inverted. See the Etc area description. |
| PF | Pacific/Gambier | Gambier Islands | Canonical | −09:00 | −09:00 | -09 | | australasia | |
| US | America/Anchorage | Alaska (most areas) | Canonical | −09:00 | −08:00 | AKST | AKDT | northamerica | |
| US | US/Alaska | | Link | −09:00 | −08:00 | AKST | AKDT | backward | Link to America/Anchorage |
| US | America/Juneau | Alaska – Juneau area | Canonical | −09:00 | −08:00 | AKST | AKDT | northamerica | |
| US | America/Metlakatla | Alaska – Annette Island | Canonical | −09:00 | −08:00 | AKST | AKDT | northamerica | |
| US | America/Nome | Alaska (west) | Canonical | −09:00 | −08:00 | AKST | AKDT | northamerica | |
| US | America/Sitka | Alaska – Sitka area | Canonical | −09:00 | −08:00 | AKST | AKDT | northamerica | |
| US | America/Yakutat | Alaska – Yakutat | Canonical | −09:00 | −08:00 | AKST | AKDT | northamerica | |
| | Etc/GMT+8 | | Canonical | −08:00 | −08:00 | -08 | | etcetera | Sign is intentionally inverted. See the Etc area description. |
| PN | Pacific/Pitcairn | | Canonical | −08:00 | −08:00 | -08 | | australasia | |
| | PST8PDT | | Canonical | −08:00 | −07:00 | PST | PDT | backward | |
| US | America/Los_Angeles | Pacific | Canonical | −08:00 | −07:00 | PST | PDT | northamerica | |
| US | US/Pacific | | Link | −08:00 | −07:00 | PST | PDT | backward | Link to America/Los_Angeles |
| MX | America/Tijuana | Baja California | Canonical | −08:00 | −07:00 | PST | PDT | northamerica | |
| MX | Mexico/BajaNorte | | Link | −08:00 | −07:00 | PST | PDT | backward | Link to America/Tijuana |
| MX | America/Ensenada | | Link^{†} | −08:00 | −07:00 | PST | PDT | backward | Link to America/Tijuana |
| MX | America/Santa_Isabel | | Link | −08:00 | −07:00 | PST | PDT | backward | Link to America/Tijuana |
| | Etc/GMT+7 | | Canonical | −07:00 | −07:00 | -07 | | etcetera | Sign is intentionally inverted. See the Etc area description. |
| CA | America/Dawson_Creek | MST – BC (Dawson Cr, Ft St John) | Canonical | −07:00 | −07:00 | MST | | northamerica | |
| CA | America/Dawson | MST – Yukon (west) | Canonical | −07:00 | −07:00 | MST | | northamerica | |
| CA | America/Fort_Nelson | MST – BC (Ft Nelson) | Canonical | −07:00 | −07:00 | MST | | northamerica | |
| MX | America/Hermosillo | Sonora | Canonical | −07:00 | −07:00 | MST | | northamerica | |
| MX | America/Mazatlan | Baja California Sur, Nayarit (most areas), Sinaloa | Canonical | −07:00 | −07:00 | MST | | northamerica | |
| MX | Mexico/BajaSur | | Link | −07:00 | −07:00 | MST | | backward | Link to America/Mazatlan |
| US, CA | America/Phoenix | MST – AZ (most areas), Creston BC | Canonical | −07:00 | −07:00 | MST | | northamerica | |
| | MST | | Link^{†} | −07:00 | −07:00 | MST | | backward | Link to America/Phoenix |
| US | US/Arizona | | Link | −07:00 | −07:00 | MST | | backward | Link to America/Phoenix |
| CA | America/Creston | MST – BC (Creston) | Link^{†} | −07:00 | −07:00 | MST | | backward | Link to America/Phoenix |
| CA | America/Vancouver | MST – BC (most areas) | Canonical | −07:00 | −07:00 | MST | | northamerica | |
| CA | Canada/Pacific | | Link | −07:00 | −07:00 | MST | | backward | Link to America/Vancouver |
| CA | America/Whitehorse | MST – Yukon (east) | Canonical | −07:00 | −07:00 | MST | | northamerica | |
| CA | Canada/Yukon | | Link | −07:00 | −07:00 | MST | | backward | Link to America/Whitehorse |
| | MST7MDT | | Canonical | −07:00 | −06:00 | MST | MDT | backward | |
| US | America/Boise | Mountain – ID (south), OR (east) | Canonical | −07:00 | −06:00 | MST | MDT | northamerica | |
| CA | America/Cambridge_Bay | Mountain – NU (west) | Canonical | −07:00 | −06:00 | MST | MDT | northamerica | |
| MX | America/Ciudad_Juarez | Chihuahua (US border – west) | Canonical | −07:00 | −06:00 | MST | MDT | northamerica | |
| US | America/Denver | Mountain (most areas) | Canonical | −07:00 | −06:00 | MST | MDT | northamerica | |
| US | Navajo | | Link | −07:00 | −06:00 | MST | MDT | backward | Link to America/Denver |
| US | US/Mountain | | Link | −07:00 | −06:00 | MST | MDT | backward | Link to America/Denver |
| US | America/Shiprock | | Link | −07:00 | −06:00 | MST | MDT | backward | Link to America/Denver |
| | Etc/GMT+6 | | Canonical | −06:00 | −06:00 | -06 | | etcetera | Sign is intentionally inverted. See the Etc area description. |
| MX | America/Bahia_Banderas | Bahía de Banderas | Canonical | −06:00 | −06:00 | CST | | northamerica | |
| BZ | America/Belize | | Canonical | −06:00 | −06:00 | CST | | northamerica | |
| MX | America/Chihuahua | Chihuahua (most areas) | Canonical | −06:00 | −06:00 | CST | | northamerica | |
| CR | America/Costa_Rica | | Canonical | −06:00 | −06:00 | CST | | northamerica | |
| CA | America/Edmonton | CST – AB, BC(E), NT(E), SK(W) | Canonical | −06:00 | −06:00 | CST | | northamerica | |
| CA | Canada/Mountain | | Link | −06:00 | −06:00 | CST | | backward | Link to America/Edmonton |
| CA | America/Yellowknife | | Link | −06:00 | −06:00 | CST | | backward | Link to America/Edmonton |
| SV | America/El_Salvador | | Canonical | −06:00 | −06:00 | CST | | northamerica | |
| EC | Pacific/Galapagos | Galápagos Islands | Canonical | −06:00 | −06:00 | -06 | | southamerica | |
| GT | America/Guatemala | | Canonical | −06:00 | −06:00 | CST | | northamerica | |
| CA | America/Inuvik | CST – NT (west) | Canonical | −06:00 | −06:00 | CST | | northamerica | |
| NI | America/Managua | | Canonical | −06:00 | −06:00 | CST | | northamerica | |
| MX | America/Merida | Campeche, Yucatán | Canonical | −06:00 | −06:00 | CST | | northamerica | |
| MX | America/Mexico_City | Central Mexico | Canonical | −06:00 | −06:00 | CST | | northamerica | |
| MX | Mexico/General | | Link | −06:00 | −06:00 | CST | | backward | Link to America/Mexico_City |
| MX | America/Monterrey | Durango; Coahuila, Nuevo León, Tamaulipas (most areas) | Canonical | −06:00 | −06:00 | CST | | northamerica | |
| CA | America/Regina | CST – SK (most areas) | Canonical | −06:00 | −06:00 | CST | | northamerica | |
| CA | Canada/Saskatchewan | | Link | −06:00 | −06:00 | CST | | backward | Link to America/Regina |
| CA | America/Swift_Current | CST – SK (midwest) | Canonical | −06:00 | −06:00 | CST | | northamerica | |
| HN | America/Tegucigalpa | | Canonical | −06:00 | −06:00 | CST | | northamerica | |
| | CST6CDT | | Canonical | −06:00 | −05:00 | CST | CDT | backward | |
| US | America/North_Dakota/Beulah | Central – ND (Mercer) | Canonical | −06:00 | −05:00 | CST | CDT | northamerica | |
| US | America/North_Dakota/Center | Central – ND (Oliver) | Canonical | −06:00 | −05:00 | CST | CDT | northamerica | |
| US | America/Chicago | Central (most areas) | Canonical | −06:00 | −05:00 | CST | CDT | northamerica | |
| US | US/Central | | Link | −06:00 | −05:00 | CST | CDT | backward | Link to America/Chicago |
| CL | Pacific/Easter | Easter Island | Canonical | −06:00 | −05:00 | -06 | -05 | southamerica | |
| CL | Chile/EasterIsland | | Link | −06:00 | −05:00 | -06 | -05 | backward | Link to Pacific/Easter |
| US | America/Indiana/Knox | Central – IN (Starke) | Canonical | −06:00 | −05:00 | CST | CDT | northamerica | |
| US | US/Indiana-Starke | | Link | −06:00 | −05:00 | CST | CDT | backward | Link to America/Indiana/Knox |
| US | America/Knox_IN | | Link | −06:00 | −05:00 | CST | CDT | backward | Link to America/Indiana/Knox |
| MX | America/Matamoros | Coahuila, Nuevo León, Tamaulipas (US border) | Canonical | −06:00 | −05:00 | CST | CDT | northamerica | |
| US | America/Menominee | Central – MI (Wisconsin border) | Canonical | −06:00 | −05:00 | CST | CDT | northamerica | |
| US | America/North_Dakota/New_Salem | Central – ND (Morton rural) | Canonical | −06:00 | −05:00 | CST | CDT | northamerica | |
| MX | America/Ojinaga | Chihuahua (US border – east) | Canonical | −06:00 | −05:00 | CST | CDT | northamerica | |
| CA | America/Rankin_Inlet | Central – NU (central) | Canonical | −06:00 | −05:00 | CST | CDT | northamerica | |
| CA | America/Resolute | Central – NU (Resolute) | Canonical | −06:00 | −05:00 | CST | CDT | northamerica | |
| US | America/Indiana/Tell_City | Central – IN (Perry) | Canonical | −06:00 | −05:00 | CST | CDT | northamerica | |
| | Etc/GMT+5 | | Canonical | −05:00 | −05:00 | -05 | | etcetera | Sign is intentionally inverted. See the Etc area description. |
| CO | America/Bogota | | Canonical | −05:00 | −05:00 | -05 | | southamerica | |
| MX | America/Cancun | Quintana Roo | Canonical | −05:00 | −05:00 | EST | | northamerica | |
| BR | America/Eirunepe | Amazonas (west) | Canonical | −05:00 | −05:00 | -05 | | southamerica | |
| EC | America/Guayaquil | Ecuador (mainland) | Canonical | −05:00 | −05:00 | -05 | | southamerica | |
| JM | America/Jamaica | | Canonical | −05:00 | −05:00 | EST | | northamerica | |
| JM | Jamaica | | Link | −05:00 | −05:00 | EST | | backward | Link to America/Jamaica |
| PE | America/Lima | | Canonical | −05:00 | −05:00 | -05 | | southamerica | |
| PA, CA, KY | America/Panama | EST – ON (Atikokan), NU (Coral H) | Canonical | −05:00 | −05:00 | EST | | northamerica | |
| | EST | | Link^{†} | −05:00 | −05:00 | EST | | backward | Link to America/Panama |
| CA | America/Atikokan | EST – ON (Atikokan), NU (Coral H) | Link^{†} | −05:00 | −05:00 | EST | | backward | Link to America/Panama |
| KY | America/Cayman | | Link^{†} | −05:00 | −05:00 | EST | | backward | Link to America/Panama |
| CA | America/Coral_Harbour | | Link^{†} | −05:00 | −05:00 | EST | | backward | Link to America/Panama |
| BR | America/Rio_Branco | Acre | Canonical | −05:00 | −05:00 | -05 | | southamerica | |
| BR | Brazil/Acre | | Link | −05:00 | −05:00 | -05 | | backward | Link to America/Rio_Branco |
| BR | America/Porto_Acre | | Link | −05:00 | −05:00 | -05 | | backward | Link to America/Rio_Branco |
| CA | America/Winnipeg | EST – Manitoba, ON (northwest) | Canonical | −05:00 | −05:00 | EST | | northamerica | |
| CA | Canada/Central | | Link | −05:00 | −05:00 | EST | | backward | Link to America/Winnipeg |
| CA | America/Rainy_River | | Link^{†} | −05:00 | −05:00 | EST | | backward | Link to America/Winnipeg |
| | EST5EDT | | Canonical | −05:00 | −04:00 | EST | EDT | backward | |
| US | America/Detroit | Eastern – MI (most areas) | Canonical | −05:00 | −04:00 | EST | EDT | northamerica | |
| US | US/Michigan | | Link | −05:00 | −04:00 | EST | EDT | backward | Link to America/Detroit |
| TC | America/Grand_Turk | | Canonical | −05:00 | −04:00 | EST | EDT | northamerica | |
| US | America/Indiana/Indianapolis | Eastern – IN (most areas) | Canonical | −05:00 | −04:00 | EST | EDT | northamerica | |
| US | US/East-Indiana | | Link | −05:00 | −04:00 | EST | EDT | backward | Link to America/Indiana/Indianapolis |
| US | America/Indianapolis | | Link | −05:00 | −04:00 | EST | EDT | backward | Link to America/Indiana/Indianapolis |
| US | America/Fort_Wayne | | Link | −05:00 | −04:00 | EST | EDT | backward | Link to America/Indiana/Indianapolis |
| CA | America/Iqaluit | Eastern – NU (most areas) | Canonical | −05:00 | −04:00 | EST | EDT | northamerica | |
| CA | America/Pangnirtung | | Link^{†} | −05:00 | −04:00 | EST | EDT | backward | Link to America/Iqaluit |
| US | America/Kentucky/Louisville | Eastern – KY (Louisville area) | Canonical | −05:00 | −04:00 | EST | EDT | northamerica | |
| US | America/Louisville | | Link | −05:00 | −04:00 | EST | EDT | backward | Link to America/Kentucky/Louisville |
| US | America/Indiana/Marengo | Eastern – IN (Crawford) | Canonical | −05:00 | −04:00 | EST | EDT | northamerica | |
| US | America/Kentucky/Monticello | Eastern – KY (Wayne) | Canonical | −05:00 | −04:00 | EST | EDT | northamerica | |
| US | America/New_York | Eastern (most areas) | Canonical | −05:00 | −04:00 | EST | EDT | northamerica | |
| US | US/Eastern | | Link | −05:00 | −04:00 | EST | EDT | backward | Link to America/New_York |
| US | America/Indiana/Petersburg | Eastern – IN (Pike) | Canonical | −05:00 | −04:00 | EST | EDT | northamerica | |
| HT | America/Port-au-Prince | | Canonical | −05:00 | −04:00 | EST | EDT | northamerica | |
| CA, BS | America/Toronto | Eastern – ON & QC (most areas) | Canonical | −05:00 | −04:00 | EST | EDT | northamerica | |
| CA | Canada/Eastern | | Link | −05:00 | −04:00 | EST | EDT | backward | Link to America/Toronto |
| BS | America/Nassau | | Link^{†} | −05:00 | −04:00 | EST | EDT | backward | Link to America/Toronto |
| CA | America/Montreal | | Link^{†} | −05:00 | −04:00 | EST | EDT | backward | Link to America/Toronto |
| CA | America/Nipigon | | Link^{†} | −05:00 | −04:00 | EST | EDT | backward | Link to America/Toronto |
| CA | America/Thunder_Bay | | Link^{†} | −05:00 | −04:00 | EST | EDT | backward | Link to America/Toronto |
| US | America/Indiana/Vevay | Eastern – IN (Switzerland) | Canonical | −05:00 | −04:00 | EST | EDT | northamerica | |
| US | America/Indiana/Vincennes | Eastern – IN (Da, Du, K, Mn) | Canonical | −05:00 | −04:00 | EST | EDT | northamerica | |
| US | America/Indiana/Winamac | Eastern – IN (Pulaski) | Canonical | −05:00 | −04:00 | EST | EDT | northamerica | |
| | Etc/GMT+4 | | Canonical | −04:00 | −04:00 | -04 | | etcetera | Sign is intentionally inverted. See the Etc area description. |
| BB | America/Barbados | | Canonical | −04:00 | −04:00 | AST | | northamerica | |
| BR | America/Boa_Vista | Roraima | Canonical | −04:00 | −04:00 | -04 | | southamerica | |
| BR | America/Campo_Grande | Mato Grosso do Sul | Canonical | −04:00 | −04:00 | -04 | | southamerica | |
| VE | America/Caracas | | Canonical | −04:00 | −04:00 | -04 | | southamerica | |
| BR | America/Cuiaba | Mato Grosso | Canonical | −04:00 | −04:00 | -04 | | southamerica | |
| GY | America/Guyana | | Canonical | −04:00 | −04:00 | -04 | | southamerica | |
| CU | America/Havana | | Canonical | −04:00 | −04:00 | CDT | CDT | northamerica | |
| CU | Cuba | | Link | −04:00 | −04:00 | CDT | CDT | backward | Link to America/Havana |
| BO | America/La_Paz | | Canonical | −04:00 | −04:00 | -04 | | southamerica | |
| BR | America/Manaus | Amazonas (east) | Canonical | −04:00 | −04:00 | -04 | | southamerica | |
| BR | Brazil/West | | Link | −04:00 | −04:00 | -04 | | backward | Link to America/Manaus |
| MQ | America/Martinique | | Canonical | −04:00 | −04:00 | AST | | northamerica | |
| BR | America/Porto_Velho | Rondônia | Canonical | −04:00 | −04:00 | -04 | | southamerica | |
| PR, AG, CA, AI, AW, BL, BQ, CW, DM, GD, GP, KN, LC, MF, MS, SX, TT, VC, VG, VI | America/Puerto_Rico | AST – QC (Lower North Shore) | Canonical | −04:00 | −04:00 | AST | | northamerica | |
| VI | America/Virgin | | Link | −04:00 | −04:00 | AST | | backward | Link to America/Puerto_Rico |
| AI | America/Anguilla | | Link^{†} | −04:00 | −04:00 | AST | | backward | Link to America/Puerto_Rico |
| AG | America/Antigua | | Link^{†} | −04:00 | −04:00 | AST | | backward | Link to America/Puerto_Rico |
| AW | America/Aruba | | Link^{†} | −04:00 | −04:00 | AST | | backward | Link to America/Puerto_Rico |
| CA | America/Blanc-Sablon | AST – QC (Lower North Shore) | Link^{†} | −04:00 | −04:00 | AST | | backward | Link to America/Puerto_Rico |
| CW | America/Curacao | | Link^{†} | −04:00 | −04:00 | AST | | backward | Link to America/Puerto_Rico |
| DM | America/Dominica | | Link^{†} | −04:00 | −04:00 | AST | | backward | Link to America/Puerto_Rico |
| GD | America/Grenada | | Link^{†} | −04:00 | −04:00 | AST | | backward | Link to America/Puerto_Rico |
| GP | America/Guadeloupe | | Link^{†} | −04:00 | −04:00 | AST | | backward | Link to America/Puerto_Rico |
| BQ | America/Kralendijk | | Link | −04:00 | −04:00 | AST | | backward | Link to America/Puerto_Rico |
| SX | America/Lower_Princes | | Link | −04:00 | −04:00 | AST | | backward | Link to America/Puerto_Rico |
| MF | America/Marigot | | Link | −04:00 | −04:00 | AST | | backward | Link to America/Puerto_Rico |
| MS | America/Montserrat | | Link^{†} | −04:00 | −04:00 | AST | | backward | Link to America/Puerto_Rico |
| TT | America/Port_of_Spain | | Link^{†} | −04:00 | −04:00 | AST | | backward | Link to America/Puerto_Rico |
| BL | America/St_Barthelemy | | Link | −04:00 | −04:00 | AST | | backward | Link to America/Puerto_Rico |
| KN | America/St_Kitts | | Link^{†} | −04:00 | −04:00 | AST | | backward | Link to America/Puerto_Rico |
| LC | America/St_Lucia | | Link^{†} | −04:00 | −04:00 | AST | | backward | Link to America/Puerto_Rico |
| VI | America/St_Thomas | | Link^{†} | −04:00 | −04:00 | AST | | backward | Link to America/Puerto_Rico |
| VC | America/St_Vincent | | Link^{†} | −04:00 | −04:00 | AST | | backward | Link to America/Puerto_Rico |
| VG | America/Tortola | | Link^{†} | −04:00 | −04:00 | AST | | backward | Link to America/Puerto_Rico |
| DO | America/Santo_Domingo | | Canonical | −04:00 | −04:00 | AST | | northamerica | |
| BM | Atlantic/Bermuda | | Canonical | −04:00 | −03:00 | AST | ADT | northamerica | |
| CA | America/Glace_Bay | Atlantic – NS (Cape Breton) | Canonical | −04:00 | −03:00 | AST | ADT | northamerica | |
| CA | America/Goose_Bay | Atlantic – Labrador (most areas) | Canonical | −04:00 | −03:00 | AST | ADT | northamerica | |
| CA | America/Halifax | Atlantic – NS (most areas), PE | Canonical | −04:00 | −03:00 | AST | ADT | northamerica | |
| CA | Canada/Atlantic | | Link | −04:00 | −03:00 | AST | ADT | backward | Link to America/Halifax |
| CA | America/Moncton | Atlantic – New Brunswick | Canonical | −04:00 | −03:00 | AST | ADT | northamerica | |
| CL | America/Santiago | most of Chile | Canonical | −04:00 | −03:00 | -04 | -03 | southamerica | |
| CL | Chile/Continental | | Link | −04:00 | −03:00 | -04 | -03 | backward | Link to America/Santiago |
| GL | America/Thule | Thule/Pituffik | Canonical | −04:00 | −03:00 | AST | ADT | europe | |
| CA | America/St_Johns | Newfoundland, Labrador (SE) | Canonical | −03:30 | −02:30 | NST | NDT | northamerica | |
| CA | Canada/Newfoundland | | Link | −03:30 | −02:30 | NST | NDT | backward | Link to America/St_Johns |
| | Etc/GMT+3 | | Canonical | −03:00 | −03:00 | -03 | | etcetera | Sign is intentionally inverted. See the Etc area description. |
| BR | America/Araguaina | Tocantins | Canonical | −03:00 | −03:00 | -03 | | southamerica | |
| PY | America/Asuncion | | Canonical | −03:00 | −03:00 | -03 | | southamerica | |
| BR | America/Bahia | Bahia | Canonical | −03:00 | −03:00 | -03 | | southamerica | |
| BR | America/Belem | Pará (east), Amapá | Canonical | −03:00 | −03:00 | -03 | | southamerica | |
| AR | America/Argentina/Buenos_Aires | Buenos Aires (BA, CF) | Canonical | −03:00 | −03:00 | -03 | | southamerica | |
| AR | America/Buenos_Aires | | Link | −03:00 | −03:00 | -03 | | backward | Link to America/Argentina/Buenos_Aires |
| AR | America/Argentina/Catamarca | Catamarca (CT), Chubut (CH) | Canonical | −03:00 | −03:00 | -03 | | southamerica | |
| AR | America/Catamarca | | Link | −03:00 | −03:00 | -03 | | backward | Link to America/Argentina/Catamarca |
| AR | America/Argentina/ComodRivadavia | | Link^{†} | −03:00 | −03:00 | -03 | | backward | Link to America/Argentina/Catamarca |
| GF | America/Cayenne | | Canonical | −03:00 | −03:00 | -03 | | southamerica | |
| AR | America/Argentina/Cordoba | most areas: CB, CC, CN, ER, FM, MN, SE, SF | Canonical | −03:00 | −03:00 | -03 | | southamerica | |
| AR | America/Cordoba | | Link | −03:00 | −03:00 | -03 | | backward | Link to America/Argentina/Cordoba |
| AR | America/Rosario | | Link^{†} | −03:00 | −03:00 | -03 | | backward | Link to America/Argentina/Cordoba |
| CL | America/Coyhaique | Aysén Region | Canonical | −03:00 | −03:00 | -03 | | southamerica | |
| BR | America/Fortaleza | Brazil (northeast: MA, PI, CE, RN, PB) | Canonical | −03:00 | −03:00 | -03 | | southamerica | |
| AR | America/Argentina/Jujuy | Jujuy (JY) | Canonical | −03:00 | −03:00 | -03 | | southamerica | |
| AR | America/Jujuy | | Link | −03:00 | −03:00 | -03 | | backward | Link to America/Argentina/Jujuy |
| AR | America/Argentina/La_Rioja | La Rioja (LR) | Canonical | −03:00 | −03:00 | -03 | | southamerica | |
| BR | America/Maceio | Alagoas, Sergipe | Canonical | −03:00 | −03:00 | -03 | | southamerica | |
| AR | America/Argentina/Mendoza | Mendoza (MZ) | Canonical | −03:00 | −03:00 | -03 | | southamerica | |
| AR | America/Mendoza | | Link | −03:00 | −03:00 | -03 | | backward | Link to America/Argentina/Mendoza |
| UY | America/Montevideo | | Canonical | −03:00 | −03:00 | -03 | | southamerica | |
| AQ | Antarctica/Palmer | Palmer | Canonical | −03:00 | −03:00 | -03 | | southamerica | Chilean Antarctica Region |
| SR | America/Paramaribo | | Canonical | −03:00 | −03:00 | -03 | | southamerica | |
| CL | America/Punta_Arenas | Magallanes Region | Canonical | −03:00 | −03:00 | -03 | | southamerica | Magallanes Region |
| BR | America/Recife | Pernambuco | Canonical | −03:00 | −03:00 | -03 | | southamerica | |
| AR | America/Argentina/Rio_Gallegos | Santa Cruz (SC) | Canonical | −03:00 | −03:00 | -03 | | southamerica | |
| AQ | Antarctica/Rothera | Rothera | Canonical | −03:00 | −03:00 | -03 | | antarctica | |
| AR | America/Argentina/Salta | Salta (SA, LP, NQ, RN) | Canonical | −03:00 | −03:00 | -03 | | southamerica | |
| AR | America/Argentina/San_Juan | San Juan (SJ) | Canonical | −03:00 | −03:00 | -03 | | southamerica | |
| AR | America/Argentina/San_Luis | San Luis (SL) | Canonical | −03:00 | −03:00 | -03 | | southamerica | |
| BR | America/Santarem | Pará (west) | Canonical | −03:00 | −03:00 | -03 | | southamerica | |
| BR | America/Sao_Paulo | Brazil (southeast: GO, DF, MG, ES, RJ, SP, PR, SC, RS) | Canonical | −03:00 | −03:00 | -03 | | southamerica | |
| BR | Brazil/East | | Link | −03:00 | −03:00 | -03 | | backward | Link to America/Sao_Paulo |
| FK | Atlantic/Stanley | | Canonical | −03:00 | −03:00 | -03 | | southamerica | |
| AR | America/Argentina/Tucuman | Tucumán (TM) | Canonical | −03:00 | −03:00 | -03 | | southamerica | |
| AR | America/Argentina/Ushuaia | Tierra del Fuego (TF) | Canonical | −03:00 | −03:00 | -03 | | southamerica | |
| PM | America/Miquelon | | Canonical | −03:00 | −02:00 | -03 | -02 | northamerica | |
| | Etc/GMT+2 | | Canonical | −02:00 | −02:00 | -02 | | etcetera | Sign is intentionally inverted. See the Etc area description. |
| BR | America/Noronha | Atlantic islands | Canonical | −02:00 | −02:00 | -02 | | southamerica | |
| BR | Brazil/DeNoronha | | Link | −02:00 | −02:00 | -02 | | backward | Link to America/Noronha |
| GS | Atlantic/South_Georgia | | Canonical | −02:00 | −02:00 | -02 | | southamerica | |
| GL | America/Nuuk | most of Greenland | Canonical | −02:00 | −01:00 | -02 | -01 | europe | |
| GL | America/Godthab | | Link | −02:00 | −01:00 | -02 | -01 | backward | Link to America/Nuuk |
| GL | America/Scoresbysund | Scoresbysund/Ittoqqortoormiit | Canonical | −02:00 | −01:00 | -02 | -01 | europe | |
| | Etc/GMT+1 | | Canonical | −01:00 | −01:00 | -01 | | etcetera | Sign is intentionally inverted. See the Etc area description. |
| CV | Atlantic/Cape_Verde | | Canonical | −01:00 | −01:00 | -01 | | africa | |
| PT | Atlantic/Azores | Azores | Canonical | −01:00 | +00:00 | -01 | +00 | europe | |
| | Factory | | Canonical | +00:00 | +00:00 | -00 | | factory | |
| | Etc/GMT | | Canonical | +00:00 | +00:00 | GMT | | etcetera | |
| | GMT | | Link | +00:00 | +00:00 | GMT | | etcetera | Link to Etc/GMT |
| | Etc/GMT+0 | | Link | +00:00 | +00:00 | GMT | | backward | Link to Etc/GMT |
| | Etc/GMT-0 | | Link | +00:00 | +00:00 | GMT | | backward | Link to Etc/GMT |
| | Etc/GMT0 | | Link | +00:00 | +00:00 | GMT | | backward | Link to Etc/GMT |
| | Etc/Greenwich | | Link | +00:00 | +00:00 | GMT | | backward | Link to Etc/GMT |
| | GMT+0 | | Link | +00:00 | +00:00 | GMT | | backward | Link to Etc/GMT |
| | GMT-0 | | Link | +00:00 | +00:00 | GMT | | backward | Link to Etc/GMT |
| | GMT0 | | Link | +00:00 | +00:00 | GMT | | backward | Link to Etc/GMT |
| | Greenwich | | Link | +00:00 | +00:00 | GMT | | backward | Link to Etc/GMT |
| | Etc/UTC | | Canonical | +00:00 | +00:00 | UTC | | etcetera | |
| | Etc/UCT | | Link | +00:00 | +00:00 | UTC | | backward | Link to Etc/UTC |
| | Etc/Universal | | Link | +00:00 | +00:00 | UTC | | backward | Link to Etc/UTC |
| | Etc/Zulu | | Link | +00:00 | +00:00 | UTC | | backward | Link to Etc/UTC |
| | UCT | | Link | +00:00 | +00:00 | UTC | | backward | Link to Etc/UTC |
| | UTC | | Link | +00:00 | +00:00 | UTC | | backward | Link to Etc/UTC |
| | Universal | | Link | +00:00 | +00:00 | UTC | | backward | Link to Etc/UTC |
| | Zulu | | Link | +00:00 | +00:00 | UTC | | backward | Link to Etc/UTC |
| CI, BF, GH, GM, GN, IS, ML, MR, SH, SL, SN, TG | Africa/Abidjan | | Canonical | +00:00 | +00:00 | GMT | | africa | |
| IS | Iceland | | Link | +00:00 | +00:00 | GMT | | backward | Link to Africa/Abidjan |
| GH | Africa/Accra | | Link^{†} | +00:00 | +00:00 | GMT | | backward | Link to Africa/Abidjan |
| ML | Africa/Bamako | | Link^{†} | +00:00 | +00:00 | GMT | | backward | Link to Africa/Abidjan |
| GM | Africa/Banjul | | Link^{†} | +00:00 | +00:00 | GMT | | backward | Link to Africa/Abidjan |
| GN | Africa/Conakry | | Link^{†} | +00:00 | +00:00 | GMT | | backward | Link to Africa/Abidjan |
| SN | Africa/Dakar | | Link^{†} | +00:00 | +00:00 | GMT | | backward | Link to Africa/Abidjan |
| SL | Africa/Freetown | | Link^{†} | +00:00 | +00:00 | GMT | | backward | Link to Africa/Abidjan |
| TG | Africa/Lome | | Link^{†} | +00:00 | +00:00 | GMT | | backward | Link to Africa/Abidjan |
| MR | Africa/Nouakchott | | Link^{†} | +00:00 | +00:00 | GMT | | backward | Link to Africa/Abidjan |
| BF | Africa/Ouagadougou | | Link^{†} | +00:00 | +00:00 | GMT | | backward | Link to Africa/Abidjan |
| IS | Atlantic/Reykjavik | | Link^{†} | +00:00 | +00:00 | GMT | | backward | Link to Africa/Abidjan |
| SH | Atlantic/St_Helena | | Link^{†} | +00:00 | +00:00 | GMT | | backward | Link to Africa/Abidjan |
| ML | Africa/Timbuktu | | Link^{†} | +00:00 | +00:00 | GMT | | backward | Link to Africa/Abidjan |
| GW | Africa/Bissau | | Canonical | +00:00 | +00:00 | GMT | | africa | |
| MA | Africa/Casablanca | | Canonical | +00:00 | +00:00 | +00 | | africa | |
| GL | America/Danmarkshavn | National Park (east coast) | Canonical | +00:00 | +00:00 | GMT | | europe | |
| EH | Africa/El_Aaiun | | Canonical | +00:00 | +00:00 | +00 | | africa | |
| LR | Africa/Monrovia | | Canonical | +00:00 | +00:00 | GMT | | africa | |
| ST | Africa/Sao_Tome | | Canonical | +00:00 | +00:00 | GMT | | africa | |
| ES | Atlantic/Canary | Canary Islands | Canonical | +00:00 | +01:00 | WET | WEST | europe | |
| IE | Europe/Dublin | | Canonical | +00:00 | +01:00 | GMT | IST | europe | As per legislation, Irish Standard Time is UTC+01 and winter time is UTC. Winter time is encoded in the DB as negative 1 hour of daylight saving. |
| IE | Eire | | Link | +00:00 | +01:00 | GMT | IST | backward | Link to Europe/Dublin |
| FO | Atlantic/Faroe | | Canonical | +00:00 | +01:00 | WET | WEST | europe | |
| FO | Atlantic/Faeroe | | Link | +00:00 | +01:00 | WET | WEST | backward | Link to Atlantic/Faroe |
| PT | Europe/Lisbon | Portugal (mainland) | Canonical | +00:00 | +01:00 | WET | WEST | europe | |
| PT | Portugal | | Link | +00:00 | +01:00 | WET | WEST | backward | Link to Europe/Lisbon |
| | WET | | Link^{†} | +00:00 | +01:00 | WET | WEST | backward | Link to Europe/Lisbon |
| GB, GG, IM, JE | Europe/London | | Canonical | +00:00 | +01:00 | GMT | BST | europe | |
| GB | GB | | Link | +00:00 | +01:00 | GMT | BST | backward | Link to Europe/London |
| GB | GB-Eire | | Link | +00:00 | +01:00 | GMT | BST | backward | Link to Europe/London |
| GG | Europe/Guernsey | | Link^{†} | +00:00 | +01:00 | GMT | BST | backward | Link to Europe/London |
| IM | Europe/Isle_of_Man | | Link^{†} | +00:00 | +01:00 | GMT | BST | backward | Link to Europe/London |
| JE | Europe/Jersey | | Link^{†} | +00:00 | +01:00 | GMT | BST | backward | Link to Europe/London |
| GB | Europe/Belfast | | Link^{†} | +00:00 | +01:00 | GMT | BST | backward | Link to Europe/London |
| PT | Atlantic/Madeira | Madeira Islands | Canonical | +00:00 | +01:00 | WET | WEST | europe | |
| AQ | Antarctica/Troll | Troll | Canonical | +00:00 | +02:00 | +00 | +02 | antarctica | Previously used +01:00 for a brief period between standard and daylight time. |
| | Etc/GMT-1 | | Canonical | +01:00 | +01:00 | +01 | | etcetera | Sign is intentionally inverted. See the Etc area description. |
| DZ | Africa/Algiers | | Canonical | +01:00 | +01:00 | CET | | africa | |
| NG, AO, BJ, CD, CF, CG, CM, GA, GQ, NE | Africa/Lagos | West Africa Time | Canonical | +01:00 | +01:00 | WAT | | africa | |
| CF | Africa/Bangui | | Link^{†} | +01:00 | +01:00 | WAT | | backward | Link to Africa/Lagos |
| CG | Africa/Brazzaville | | Link^{†} | +01:00 | +01:00 | WAT | | backward | Link to Africa/Lagos |
| CM | Africa/Douala | | Link^{†} | +01:00 | +01:00 | WAT | | backward | Link to Africa/Lagos |
| CD | Africa/Kinshasa | Dem. Rep. of Congo (west) | Link^{†} | +01:00 | +01:00 | WAT | | backward | Link to Africa/Lagos |
| GA | Africa/Libreville | | Link^{†} | +01:00 | +01:00 | WAT | | backward | Link to Africa/Lagos |
| AO | Africa/Luanda | | Link^{†} | +01:00 | +01:00 | WAT | | backward | Link to Africa/Lagos |
| GQ | Africa/Malabo | | Link^{†} | +01:00 | +01:00 | WAT | | backward | Link to Africa/Lagos |
| NE | Africa/Niamey | | Link^{†} | +01:00 | +01:00 | WAT | | backward | Link to Africa/Lagos |
| BJ | Africa/Porto-Novo | | Link^{†} | +01:00 | +01:00 | WAT | | backward | Link to Africa/Lagos |
| TD | Africa/Ndjamena | | Canonical | +01:00 | +01:00 | WAT | | africa | |
| TN | Africa/Tunis | | Canonical | +01:00 | +01:00 | CET | | africa | |
| AD | Europe/Andorra | | Canonical | +01:00 | +02:00 | CET | CEST | europe | |
| RS, BA, HR, ME, MK, SI | Europe/Belgrade | | Canonical | +01:00 | +02:00 | CET | CEST | europe | |
| SI | Europe/Ljubljana | | Link^{†} | +01:00 | +02:00 | CET | CEST | backward | Link to Europe/Belgrade |
| ME | Europe/Podgorica | | Link | +01:00 | +02:00 | CET | CEST | backward | Link to Europe/Belgrade |
| BA | Europe/Sarajevo | | Link^{†} | +01:00 | +02:00 | CET | CEST | backward | Link to Europe/Belgrade |
| MK | Europe/Skopje | | Link^{†} | +01:00 | +02:00 | CET | CEST | backward | Link to Europe/Belgrade |
| HR | Europe/Zagreb | | Link^{†} | +01:00 | +02:00 | CET | CEST | backward | Link to Europe/Belgrade |
| DE, DK, NO, SE, SJ | Europe/Berlin | most of Germany | Canonical | +01:00 | +02:00 | CET | CEST | europe | In 1945, the Trizone did not follow Berlin's switch to DST, see Time in Germany |
| SJ | Arctic/Longyearbyen | | Link | +01:00 | +02:00 | CET | CEST | backward | Link to Europe/Berlin |
| DK | Europe/Copenhagen | | Link^{†} | +01:00 | +02:00 | CET | CEST | backward | Link to Europe/Berlin |
| NO | Europe/Oslo | | Link^{†} | +01:00 | +02:00 | CET | CEST | backward | Link to Europe/Berlin |
| SE | Europe/Stockholm | | Link^{†} | +01:00 | +02:00 | CET | CEST | backward | Link to Europe/Berlin |
| SJ | Atlantic/Jan_Mayen | | Link^{†} | +01:00 | +02:00 | CET | CEST | backward | Link to Europe/Berlin |
| BE, LU, NL | Europe/Brussels | | Canonical | +01:00 | +02:00 | CET | CEST | europe | |
| | CET | | Link^{†} | +01:00 | +02:00 | CET | CEST | backward | Link to Europe/Brussels |
| | MET | | Link^{†} | +01:00 | +02:00 | CET | CEST | backward | Link to Europe/Brussels |
| NL | Europe/Amsterdam | | Link^{†} | +01:00 | +02:00 | CET | CEST | backward | Link to Europe/Brussels |
| LU | Europe/Luxembourg | | Link^{†} | +01:00 | +02:00 | CET | CEST | backward | Link to Europe/Brussels |
| HU | Europe/Budapest | | Canonical | +01:00 | +02:00 | CET | CEST | europe | |
| ES | Africa/Ceuta | Ceuta, Melilla | Canonical | +01:00 | +02:00 | CET | CEST | europe | |
| GI | Europe/Gibraltar | | Canonical | +01:00 | +02:00 | CET | CEST | europe | |
| ES | Europe/Madrid | Spain (mainland) | Canonical | +01:00 | +02:00 | CET | CEST | europe | |
| MT | Europe/Malta | | Canonical | +01:00 | +02:00 | CET | CEST | europe | |
| FR, MC | Europe/Paris | | Canonical | +01:00 | +02:00 | CET | CEST | europe | |
| MC | Europe/Monaco | | Link^{†} | +01:00 | +02:00 | CET | CEST | backward | Link to Europe/Paris |
| CZ, SK | Europe/Prague | | Canonical | +01:00 | +02:00 | CET | CEST | europe | |
| SK | Europe/Bratislava | | Link | +01:00 | +02:00 | CET | CEST | backward | Link to Europe/Prague |
| IT, SM, VA | Europe/Rome | | Canonical | +01:00 | +02:00 | CET | CEST | europe | |
| SM | Europe/San_Marino | | Link | +01:00 | +02:00 | CET | CEST | backward | Link to Europe/Rome |
| VA | Europe/Vatican | | Link | +01:00 | +02:00 | CET | CEST | backward | Link to Europe/Rome |
| AL | Europe/Tirane | | Canonical | +01:00 | +02:00 | CET | CEST | europe | |
| AT | Europe/Vienna | | Canonical | +01:00 | +02:00 | CET | CEST | europe | |
| PL | Europe/Warsaw | | Canonical | +01:00 | +02:00 | CET | CEST | europe | |
| PL | Poland | | Link | +01:00 | +02:00 | CET | CEST | backward | Link to Europe/Warsaw |
| CH, DE, LI | Europe/Zurich | Büsingen | Canonical | +01:00 | +02:00 | CET | CEST | europe | |
| DE | Europe/Busingen | Busingen | Link | +01:00 | +02:00 | CET | CEST | backward | Link to Europe/Zurich |
| LI | Europe/Vaduz | | Link^{†} | +01:00 | +02:00 | CET | CEST | backward | Link to Europe/Zurich |
| | Etc/GMT-2 | | Canonical | +02:00 | +02:00 | +02 | | etcetera | Sign is intentionally inverted. See the Etc area description. |
| ZA, LS, SZ | Africa/Johannesburg | | Canonical | +02:00 | +02:00 | SAST | | africa | |
| LS | Africa/Maseru | | Link^{†} | +02:00 | +02:00 | SAST | | backward | Link to Africa/Johannesburg |
| SZ | Africa/Mbabane | | Link^{†} | +02:00 | +02:00 | SAST | | backward | Link to Africa/Johannesburg |
| SS | Africa/Juba | | Canonical | +02:00 | +02:00 | CAT | | africa | |
| RU | Europe/Kaliningrad | MSK-01 – Kaliningrad | Canonical | +02:00 | +02:00 | EET | | europe | |
| SD | Africa/Khartoum | | Canonical | +02:00 | +02:00 | CAT | | africa | |
| MZ, BI, BW, CD, MW, RW, ZM, ZW | Africa/Maputo | Central Africa Time | Canonical | +02:00 | +02:00 | CAT | | africa | |
| MW | Africa/Blantyre | | Link^{†} | +02:00 | +02:00 | CAT | | backward | Link to Africa/Maputo |
| BI | Africa/Bujumbura | | Link^{†} | +02:00 | +02:00 | CAT | | backward | Link to Africa/Maputo |
| BW | Africa/Gaborone | | Link^{†} | +02:00 | +02:00 | CAT | | backward | Link to Africa/Maputo |
| ZW | Africa/Harare | | Link^{†} | +02:00 | +02:00 | CAT | | backward | Link to Africa/Maputo |
| RW | Africa/Kigali | | Link^{†} | +02:00 | +02:00 | CAT | | backward | Link to Africa/Maputo |
| CD | Africa/Lubumbashi | Dem. Rep. of Congo (east) | Link^{†} | +02:00 | +02:00 | CAT | | backward | Link to Africa/Maputo |
| ZM | Africa/Lusaka | | Link^{†} | +02:00 | +02:00 | CAT | | backward | Link to Africa/Maputo |
| LY | Africa/Tripoli | | Canonical | +02:00 | +02:00 | EET | | africa | |
| LY | Libya | | Link | +02:00 | +02:00 | EET | | backward | Link to Africa/Tripoli |
| NA | Africa/Windhoek | | Canonical | +02:00 | +02:00 | CAT | | africa | |
| GR | Europe/Athens | | Canonical | +02:00 | +03:00 | EET | EEST | europe | |
| | EET | | Link^{†} | +02:00 | +03:00 | EET | EEST | backward | Link to Europe/Athens |
| LB | Asia/Beirut | | Canonical | +02:00 | +03:00 | EET | EEST | asia | |
| RO | Europe/Bucharest | | Canonical | +02:00 | +03:00 | EET | EEST | europe | |
| EG | Africa/Cairo | | Canonical | +02:00 | +03:00 | EET | EEST | africa | |
| EG | Egypt | | Link | +02:00 | +03:00 | EET | EEST | backward | Link to Africa/Cairo |
| MD | Europe/Chisinau | | Canonical | +02:00 | +03:00 | EET | EEST | europe | |
| MD | Europe/Tiraspol | | Link^{†} | +02:00 | +03:00 | EET | EEST | backward | Link to Europe/Chisinau |
| CY | Asia/Famagusta | Northern Cyprus | Canonical | +02:00 | +03:00 | EET | EEST | asia | |
| PS | Asia/Gaza | Gaza Strip | Canonical | +02:00 | +03:00 | EET | EEST | asia | |
| PS | Asia/Hebron | West Bank | Canonical | +02:00 | +03:00 | EET | EEST | asia | |
| FI, AX | Europe/Helsinki | | Canonical | +02:00 | +03:00 | EET | EEST | europe | |
| AX | Europe/Mariehamn | | Link | +02:00 | +03:00 | EET | EEST | backward | Link to Europe/Helsinki |
| IL | Asia/Jerusalem | | Canonical | +02:00 | +03:00 | IST | IDT | asia | |
| IL | Israel | | Link | +02:00 | +03:00 | IST | IDT | backward | Link to Asia/Jerusalem |
| IL | Asia/Tel_Aviv | | Link^{†} | +02:00 | +03:00 | IST | IDT | backward | Link to Asia/Jerusalem |
| UA | Europe/Kyiv | most of Ukraine | Canonical | +02:00 | +03:00 | EET | EEST | europe | |
| UA | Europe/Uzhgorod | | Link | +02:00 | +03:00 | EET | EEST | backward | Link to Europe/Kyiv |
| UA | Europe/Zaporozhye | | Link | +02:00 | +03:00 | EET | EEST | backward | Link to Europe/Kyiv |
| UA | Europe/Kiev | | Link | +02:00 | +03:00 | EET | EEST | backward | Link to Europe/Kyiv |
| CY | Asia/Nicosia | most of Cyprus | Canonical | +02:00 | +03:00 | EET | EEST | asia | |
| CY | Europe/Nicosia | | Link | +02:00 | +03:00 | EET | EEST | backward | Link to Asia/Nicosia |
| LV | Europe/Riga | | Canonical | +02:00 | +03:00 | EET | EEST | europe | |
| BG | Europe/Sofia | | Canonical | +02:00 | +03:00 | EET | EEST | europe | |
| EE | Europe/Tallinn | | Canonical | +02:00 | +03:00 | EET | EEST | europe | |
| LT | Europe/Vilnius | | Canonical | +02:00 | +03:00 | EET | EEST | europe | |
| | Etc/GMT-3 | | Canonical | +03:00 | +03:00 | +03 | | etcetera | Sign is intentionally inverted. See the Etc area description. |
| JO | Asia/Amman | | Canonical | +03:00 | +03:00 | +03 | | asia | |
| IQ | Asia/Baghdad | | Canonical | +03:00 | +03:00 | +03 | | asia | |
| SY | Asia/Damascus | | Canonical | +03:00 | +03:00 | +03 | | asia | |
| TR | Europe/Istanbul | | Canonical | +03:00 | +03:00 | +03 | | europe | |
| TR | Turkey | | Link | +03:00 | +03:00 | +03 | | backward | Link to Europe/Istanbul |
| TR | Asia/Istanbul | | Link | +03:00 | +03:00 | +03 | | backward | Link to Europe/Istanbul |
| RU | Europe/Kirov | MSK+00 – Kirov | Canonical | +03:00 | +03:00 | MSK | | europe | |
| BY | Europe/Minsk | | Canonical | +03:00 | +03:00 | +03 | | europe | |
| RU | Europe/Moscow | MSK+00 – Moscow area | Canonical | +03:00 | +03:00 | MSK | | europe | |
| RU | W-SU | | Link | +03:00 | +03:00 | MSK | | backward | Link to Europe/Moscow |
| KE, DJ, ER, ET, KM, MG, SO, TZ, UG, YT | Africa/Nairobi | | Canonical | +03:00 | +03:00 | EAT | | africa | |
| ET | Africa/Addis_Ababa | | Link^{†} | +03:00 | +03:00 | EAT | | backward | Link to Africa/Nairobi |
| ER | Africa/Asmara | | Link^{†} | +03:00 | +03:00 | EAT | | backward | Link to Africa/Nairobi |
| TZ | Africa/Dar_es_Salaam | | Link^{†} | +03:00 | +03:00 | EAT | | backward | Link to Africa/Nairobi |
| DJ | Africa/Djibouti | | Link^{†} | +03:00 | +03:00 | EAT | | backward | Link to Africa/Nairobi |
| UG | Africa/Kampala | | Link^{†} | +03:00 | +03:00 | EAT | | backward | Link to Africa/Nairobi |
| SO | Africa/Mogadishu | | Link^{†} | +03:00 | +03:00 | EAT | | backward | Link to Africa/Nairobi |
| MG | Indian/Antananarivo | | Link^{†} | +03:00 | +03:00 | EAT | | backward | Link to Africa/Nairobi |
| KM | Indian/Comoro | | Link^{†} | +03:00 | +03:00 | EAT | | backward | Link to Africa/Nairobi |
| YT | Indian/Mayotte | | Link^{†} | +03:00 | +03:00 | EAT | | backward | Link to Africa/Nairobi |
| ER | Africa/Asmera | | Link | +03:00 | +03:00 | EAT | | backward | Link to Africa/Nairobi |
| QA, BH | Asia/Qatar | | Canonical | +03:00 | +03:00 | +03 | | asia | |
| BH | Asia/Bahrain | | Link^{†} | +03:00 | +03:00 | +03 | | backward | Link to Asia/Qatar |
| SA, AQ, KW, YE | Asia/Riyadh | Syowa | Canonical | +03:00 | +03:00 | +03 | | asia | |
| AQ | Antarctica/Syowa | Syowa | Link^{†} | +03:00 | +03:00 | +03 | | backward | Link to Asia/Riyadh |
| YE | Asia/Aden | | Link^{†} | +03:00 | +03:00 | +03 | | backward | Link to Asia/Riyadh |
| KW | Asia/Kuwait | | Link^{†} | +03:00 | +03:00 | +03 | | backward | Link to Asia/Riyadh |
| RU, UA | Europe/Simferopol | Crimea | Canonical | +03:00 | +03:00 | MSK | | europe | Disputed – Reflects data in the TZDB. (Note: The Europe/Simferopol entry in the tz database includes the disputed 2014 transition from Ukraine Time to Moscow Time related to the Annexation of Crimea by the Russian Federation. Europe/Kyiv for Ukraine Time can be used instead.) |
| RU | Europe/Volgograd | MSK+00 – Volgograd | Canonical | +03:00 | +03:00 | MSK | | europe | |
| IR | Asia/Tehran | | Canonical | +03:30 | +03:30 | +0330 | | asia | |
| IR | Iran | | Link | +03:30 | +03:30 | +0330 | | backward | Link to Asia/Tehran |
| | Etc/GMT-4 | | Canonical | +04:00 | +04:00 | +04 | | etcetera | Sign is intentionally inverted. See the Etc area description. |
| RU | Europe/Astrakhan | MSK+01 – Astrakhan | Canonical | +04:00 | +04:00 | +04 | | europe | |
| AZ | Asia/Baku | | Canonical | +04:00 | +04:00 | +04 | | asia | |
| AE, OM, RE, SC, TF | Asia/Dubai | Crozet | Canonical | +04:00 | +04:00 | +04 | | asia | |
| OM | Asia/Muscat | | Link^{†} | +04:00 | +04:00 | +04 | | backward | Link to Asia/Dubai |
| SC | Indian/Mahe | | Link^{†} | +04:00 | +04:00 | +04 | | backward | Link to Asia/Dubai |
| RE | Indian/Reunion | | Link^{†} | +04:00 | +04:00 | +04 | | backward | Link to Asia/Dubai |
| MU | Indian/Mauritius | | Canonical | +04:00 | +04:00 | +04 | | africa | |
| RU | Europe/Samara | MSK+01 – Samara, Udmurtia | Canonical | +04:00 | +04:00 | +04 | | europe | |
| RU | Europe/Saratov | MSK+01 – Saratov | Canonical | +04:00 | +04:00 | +04 | | europe | |
| GE | Asia/Tbilisi | | Canonical | +04:00 | +04:00 | +04 | | asia | |
| RU | Europe/Ulyanovsk | MSK+01 – Ulyanovsk | Canonical | +04:00 | +04:00 | +04 | | europe | |
| AM | Asia/Yerevan | | Canonical | +04:00 | +04:00 | +04 | | asia | |
| AF | Asia/Kabul | | Canonical | +04:30 | +04:30 | +0430 | | asia | |
| | Etc/GMT-5 | | Canonical | +05:00 | +05:00 | +05 | | etcetera | Sign is intentionally inverted. See the Etc area description. |
| KZ | Asia/Almaty | most of Kazakhstan | Canonical | +05:00 | +05:00 | +05 | | asia | |
| KZ | Asia/Aqtobe | Aqtöbe/Aktobe | Canonical | +05:00 | +05:00 | +05 | | asia | |
| KZ | Asia/Aqtau | Mangghystaū/Mankistau | Canonical | +05:00 | +05:00 | +05 | | asia | |
| TM | Asia/Ashgabat | | Canonical | +05:00 | +05:00 | +05 | | asia | |
| TM | Asia/Ashkhabad | | Link | +05:00 | +05:00 | +05 | | backward | Link to Asia/Ashgabat |
| KZ | Asia/Atyrau | Atyraū/Atirau/Gur’yev | Canonical | +05:00 | +05:00 | +05 | | asia | |
| TJ | Asia/Dushanbe | | Canonical | +05:00 | +05:00 | +05 | | asia | |
| PK | Asia/Karachi | | Canonical | +05:00 | +05:00 | PKT | | asia | |
| MV, TF | Indian/Maldives | Kerguelen, St Paul I, Amsterdam I | Canonical | +05:00 | +05:00 | +05 | | asia | |
| TF | Indian/Kerguelen | | Link^{†} | +05:00 | +05:00 | +05 | | backward | Link to Indian/Maldives |
| AQ | Antarctica/Mawson | Mawson | Canonical | +05:00 | +05:00 | +05 | | antarctica | |
| KZ | Asia/Oral | West Kazakhstan | Canonical | +05:00 | +05:00 | +05 | | asia | |
| KZ | Asia/Qostanay | Qostanay/Kostanay/Kustanay | Canonical | +05:00 | +05:00 | +05 | | asia | |
| KZ | Asia/Qyzylorda | Qyzylorda/Kyzylorda/Kzyl-Orda | Canonical | +05:00 | +05:00 | +05 | | asia | |
| UZ | Asia/Samarkand | Uzbekistan (west) | Canonical | +05:00 | +05:00 | +05 | | asia | |
| UZ | Asia/Tashkent | Uzbekistan (east) | Canonical | +05:00 | +05:00 | +05 | | asia | |
| AQ | Antarctica/Vostok | Vostok | Canonical | +05:00 | +05:00 | +05 | | antarctica | |
| RU | Asia/Yekaterinburg | MSK+02 – Urals | Canonical | +05:00 | +05:00 | +05 | | europe | |
| LK | Asia/Colombo | | Canonical | +05:30 | +05:30 | +0530 | | asia | |
| IN | Asia/Kolkata | | Canonical | +05:30 | +05:30 | IST | | asia | Note: Different zones in history, see Time in India. |
| IN | Asia/Calcutta | | Link | +05:30 | +05:30 | IST | | backward | Link to Asia/Kolkata |
| NP | Asia/Kathmandu | | Canonical | +05:45 | +05:45 | +0545 | | asia | |
| NP | Asia/Katmandu | | Link | +05:45 | +05:45 | +0545 | | backward | Link to Asia/Kathmandu |
| | Etc/GMT-6 | | Canonical | +06:00 | +06:00 | +06 | | etcetera | Sign is intentionally inverted. See the Etc area description. |
| KG | Asia/Bishkek | | Canonical | +06:00 | +06:00 | +06 | | asia | |
| IO | Indian/Chagos | | Canonical | +06:00 | +06:00 | +06 | | asia | |
| BD | Asia/Dhaka | | Canonical | +06:00 | +06:00 | +06 | | asia | |
| BD | Asia/Dacca | | Link | +06:00 | +06:00 | +06 | | backward | Link to Asia/Dhaka |
| RU | Asia/Omsk | MSK+03 – Omsk | Canonical | +06:00 | +06:00 | +06 | | europe | |
| BT | Asia/Thimphu | | Canonical | +06:00 | +06:00 | +06 | | asia | |
| BT | Asia/Thimbu | | Link | +06:00 | +06:00 | +06 | | backward | Link to Asia/Thimphu |
| CN | Asia/Urumqi | Xinjiang Time | Canonical | +06:00 | +06:00 | +06 | | asia | The Asia/Urumqi entry in the tz database reflected the use of Xinjiang Time by part of the local population. Consider using Asia/Shanghai for Beijing Time if that is preferred. |
| CN | Asia/Kashgar | | Link^{†} | +06:00 | +06:00 | +06 | | backward | Link to Asia/Urumqi (Note: The Asia/Kashgar entry in the tz database reflected the use of Xinjiang Time by part of the local population. Consider using Asia/Shanghai for Beijing Time if that is preferred.) |
| MM, CC | Asia/Yangon | | Canonical | +06:30 | +06:30 | +0630 | | asia | |
| CC | Indian/Cocos | | Link^{†} | +06:30 | +06:30 | +0630 | | backward | Link to Asia/Yangon |
| MM | Asia/Rangoon | | Link | +06:30 | +06:30 | +0630 | | backward | Link to Asia/Yangon |
| | Etc/GMT-7 | | Canonical | +07:00 | +07:00 | +07 | | etcetera | Sign is intentionally inverted. See the Etc area description. |
| TH, CX, KH, LA, VN | Asia/Bangkok | north Vietnam | Canonical | +07:00 | +07:00 | +07 | | asia | |
| KH | Asia/Phnom_Penh | | Link^{†} | +07:00 | +07:00 | +07 | | backward | Link to Asia/Bangkok |
| LA | Asia/Vientiane | | Link^{†} | +07:00 | +07:00 | +07 | | backward | Link to Asia/Bangkok |
| CX | Indian/Christmas | | Link^{†} | +07:00 | +07:00 | +07 | | backward | Link to Asia/Bangkok |
| RU | Asia/Barnaul | MSK+04 – Altai | Canonical | +07:00 | +07:00 | +07 | | europe | |
| AQ | Antarctica/Davis | Davis | Canonical | +07:00 | +07:00 | +07 | | antarctica | |
| VN | Asia/Ho_Chi_Minh | south Vietnam | Canonical | +07:00 | +07:00 | +07 | | asia | |
| VN | Asia/Saigon | | Link | +07:00 | +07:00 | +07 | | backward | Link to Asia/Ho_Chi_Minh |
| MN | Asia/Hovd | Bayan-Ölgii, Hovd, Uvs | Canonical | +07:00 | +07:00 | +07 | | asia | |
| ID | Asia/Jakarta | Java, Sumatra | Canonical | +07:00 | +07:00 | WIB | | asia | |
| RU | Asia/Krasnoyarsk | MSK+04 – Krasnoyarsk area | Canonical | +07:00 | +07:00 | +07 | | europe | |
| RU | Asia/Novosibirsk | MSK+04 – Novosibirsk | Canonical | +07:00 | +07:00 | +07 | | europe | |
| RU | Asia/Novokuznetsk | MSK+04 – Kemerovo | Canonical | +07:00 | +07:00 | +07 | | europe | |
| ID | Asia/Pontianak | Borneo (west, central) | Canonical | +07:00 | +07:00 | WIB | | asia | |
| RU | Asia/Tomsk | MSK+04 – Tomsk | Canonical | +07:00 | +07:00 | +07 | | europe | |
| | Etc/GMT-8 | | Canonical | +08:00 | +08:00 | +08 | | etcetera | Sign is intentionally inverted. See the Etc area description. |
| AQ | Antarctica/Casey | Casey | Canonical | +08:00 | +08:00 | +08 | | antarctica | |
| HK | Asia/Hong_Kong | | Canonical | +08:00 | +08:00 | HKT | | asia | |
| HK | Hongkong | | Link | +08:00 | +08:00 | HKT | | backward | Link to Asia/Hong_Kong |
| RU | Asia/Irkutsk | MSK+05 – Irkutsk, Buryatia | Canonical | +08:00 | +08:00 | +08 | | europe | |
| MY, BN | Asia/Kuching | Sabah, Sarawak | Canonical | +08:00 | +08:00 | +08 | | asia | |
| BN | Asia/Brunei | | Link^{†} | +08:00 | +08:00 | +08 | | backward | Link to Asia/Kuching |
| MO | Asia/Macau | | Canonical | +08:00 | +08:00 | CST | | asia | |
| MO | Asia/Macao | | Link | +08:00 | +08:00 | CST | | backward | Link to Asia/Macau |
| ID | Asia/Makassar | Borneo (east, south), Sulawesi/Celebes, Bali, Nusa Tengarra, Timor (west) | Canonical | +08:00 | +08:00 | WITA | | asia | |
| ID | Asia/Ujung_Pandang | | Link | +08:00 | +08:00 | WITA | | backward | Link to Asia/Makassar |
| PH | Asia/Manila | | Canonical | +08:00 | +08:00 | PST | | asia | |
| AU | Australia/Perth | Western Australia (most areas) | Canonical | +08:00 | +08:00 | AWST | | australasia | |
| AU | Australia/West | | Link | +08:00 | +08:00 | AWST | | backward | Link to Australia/Perth |
| CN | Asia/Shanghai | Beijing Time | Canonical | +08:00 | +08:00 | CST | | asia | |
| CN | PRC | | Link | +08:00 | +08:00 | CST | | backward | Link to Asia/Shanghai |
| CN | Asia/Chongqing | | Link^{†} | +08:00 | +08:00 | CST | | backward | Link to Asia/Shanghai |
| CN | Asia/Harbin | | Link^{†} | +08:00 | +08:00 | CST | | backward | Link to Asia/Shanghai |
| CN | Asia/Chungking | | Link | +08:00 | +08:00 | CST | | backward | Link to Asia/Shanghai |
| SG, AQ, MY | Asia/Singapore | peninsular Malaysia, Concordia | Canonical | +08:00 | +08:00 | +08 | | asia | |
| SG | Singapore | | Link | +08:00 | +08:00 | +08 | | backward | Link to Asia/Singapore |
| MY | Asia/Kuala_Lumpur | Malaysia (peninsula) | Link^{†} | +08:00 | +08:00 | +08 | | backward | Link to Asia/Singapore |
| TW | Asia/Taipei | | Canonical | +08:00 | +08:00 | CST | | asia | |
| TW | ROC | | Link | +08:00 | +08:00 | CST | | backward | Link to Asia/Taipei |
| MN | Asia/Ulaanbaatar | most of Mongolia | Canonical | +08:00 | +08:00 | +08 | | asia | |
| MN | Asia/Choibalsan | | Link | +08:00 | +08:00 | +08 | | backward | Link to Asia/Ulaanbaatar |
| MN | Asia/Ulan_Bator | | Link | +08:00 | +08:00 | +08 | | backward | Link to Asia/Ulaanbaatar |
| AU | Australia/Eucla | Western Australia (Eucla) | Canonical | +08:45 | +08:45 | +0845 | | australasia | |
| | Etc/GMT-9 | | Canonical | +09:00 | +09:00 | +09 | | etcetera | Sign is intentionally inverted. See the Etc area description. |
| RU | Asia/Chita | MSK+06 – Zabaykalsky | Canonical | +09:00 | +09:00 | +09 | | europe | |
| TL | Asia/Dili | | Canonical | +09:00 | +09:00 | +09 | | asia | |
| ID | Asia/Jayapura | New Guinea (West Papua / Irian Jaya), Malukus/Moluccas | Canonical | +09:00 | +09:00 | WIT | | asia | |
| RU | Asia/Khandyga | MSK+06 – Tomponsky, Ust-Maysky | Canonical | +09:00 | +09:00 | +09 | | europe | |
| PW | Pacific/Palau | | Canonical | +09:00 | +09:00 | +09 | | australasia | |
| KP | Asia/Pyongyang | | Canonical | +09:00 | +09:00 | KST | | asia | |
| KR | Asia/Seoul | | Canonical | +09:00 | +09:00 | KST | | asia | |
| KR | ROK | | Link | +09:00 | +09:00 | KST | | backward | Link to Asia/Seoul |
| JP, AU | Asia/Tokyo | Eyre Bird Observatory | Canonical | +09:00 | +09:00 | JST | | asia | |
| JP | Japan | | Link | +09:00 | +09:00 | JST | | backward | Link to Asia/Tokyo |
| RU | Asia/Yakutsk | MSK+06 – Lena River | Canonical | +09:00 | +09:00 | +09 | | europe | |
| AU | Australia/Darwin | Northern Territory | Canonical | +09:30 | +09:30 | ACST | | australasia | |
| AU | Australia/North | | Link | +09:30 | +09:30 | ACST | | backward | Link to Australia/Darwin |
| AU | Australia/Adelaide | South Australia | Canonical | +09:30 | +10:30 | ACST | ACDT | australasia | |
| AU | Australia/South | | Link | +09:30 | +10:30 | ACST | ACDT | backward | Link to Australia/Adelaide |
| AU | Australia/Broken_Hill | New South Wales (Yancowinna) | Canonical | +09:30 | +10:30 | ACST | ACDT | australasia | |
| AU | Australia/Yancowinna | | Link | +09:30 | +10:30 | ACST | ACDT | backward | Link to Australia/Broken_Hill |
| | Etc/GMT-10 | | Canonical | +10:00 | +10:00 | +10 | | etcetera | Sign is intentionally inverted. See the Etc area description. |
| AU | Australia/Brisbane | Queensland (most areas) | Canonical | +10:00 | +10:00 | AEST | | australasia | |
| AU | Australia/Queensland | | Link | +10:00 | +10:00 | AEST | | backward | Link to Australia/Brisbane |
| GU, MP | Pacific/Guam | | Canonical | +10:00 | +10:00 | ChST | | australasia | |
| MP | Pacific/Saipan | | Link^{†} | +10:00 | +10:00 | ChST | | backward | Link to Pacific/Guam |
| AU | Australia/Lindeman | Queensland (Whitsunday Islands) | Canonical | +10:00 | +10:00 | AEST | | australasia | |
| PG, AQ, FM | Pacific/Port_Moresby | Papua New Guinea (most areas), Chuuk, Yap, Dumont d’Urville | Canonical | +10:00 | +10:00 | +10 | | australasia | |
| AQ | Antarctica/DumontDUrville | Dumont-d'Urville | Link^{†} | +10:00 | +10:00 | +10 | | backward | Link to Pacific/Port_Moresby |
| FM | Pacific/Chuuk | Chuuk/Truk, Yap | Link^{†} | +10:00 | +10:00 | +10 | | backward | Link to Pacific/Port_Moresby |
| FM | Pacific/Yap | | Link | +10:00 | +10:00 | +10 | | backward | Link to Pacific/Port_Moresby |
| FM | Pacific/Truk | | Link | +10:00 | +10:00 | +10 | | backward | Link to Pacific/Port_Moresby |
| RU | Asia/Ust-Nera | MSK+07 – Oymyakonsky | Canonical | +10:00 | +10:00 | +10 | | europe | |
| RU | Asia/Vladivostok | MSK+07 – Amur River | Canonical | +10:00 | +10:00 | +10 | | europe | |
| AU | Australia/Hobart | Tasmania | Canonical | +10:00 | +11:00 | AEST | AEDT | australasia | |
| AU | Australia/Tasmania | | Link | +10:00 | +11:00 | AEST | AEDT | backward | Link to Australia/Hobart |
| AU | Australia/Currie | | Link^{†} | +10:00 | +11:00 | AEST | AEDT | backward | Link to Australia/Hobart |
| AU | Antarctica/Macquarie | Macquarie Island | Canonical | +10:00 | +11:00 | AEST | AEDT | australasia | |
| AU | Australia/Melbourne | Victoria | Canonical | +10:00 | +11:00 | AEST | AEDT | australasia | |
| AU | Australia/Victoria | | Link | +10:00 | +11:00 | AEST | AEDT | backward | Link to Australia/Melbourne |
| AU | Australia/Sydney | New South Wales (most areas) | Canonical | +10:00 | +11:00 | AEST | AEDT | australasia | |
| AU | Australia/ACT | | Link | +10:00 | +11:00 | AEST | AEDT | backward | Link to Australia/Sydney |
| AU | Australia/NSW | | Link | +10:00 | +11:00 | AEST | AEDT | backward | Link to Australia/Sydney |
| AU | Australia/Canberra | | Link | +10:00 | +11:00 | AEST | AEDT | backward | Link to Australia/Sydney |
| AU | Australia/Lord_Howe | Lord Howe Island | Canonical | +10:30 | +11:00 | +1030 | +11 | australasia | This is the only time zone in the world that uses 30-minute DST transitions. |
| AU | Australia/LHI | | Link | +10:30 | +11:00 | +1030 | +11 | backward | Link to Australia/Lord_Howe |
| | Etc/GMT-11 | | Canonical | +11:00 | +11:00 | +11 | | etcetera | Sign is intentionally inverted. See the Etc area description. |
| PG | Pacific/Bougainville | Bougainville | Canonical | +11:00 | +11:00 | +11 | | australasia | |
| VU | Pacific/Efate | | Canonical | +11:00 | +11:00 | +11 | | australasia | |
| SB, FM | Pacific/Guadalcanal | Pohnpei | Canonical | +11:00 | +11:00 | +11 | | australasia | |
| FM | Pacific/Pohnpei | Pohnpei/Ponape | Link^{†} | +11:00 | +11:00 | +11 | | backward | Link to Pacific/Guadalcanal |
| FM | Pacific/Ponape | | Link | +11:00 | +11:00 | +11 | | backward | Link to Pacific/Guadalcanal |
| FM | Pacific/Kosrae | Kosrae | Canonical | +11:00 | +11:00 | +11 | | australasia | |
| RU | Asia/Magadan | MSK+08 – Magadan | Canonical | +11:00 | +11:00 | +11 | | europe | |
| NC | Pacific/Noumea | | Canonical | +11:00 | +11:00 | +11 | | australasia | |
| RU | Asia/Sakhalin | MSK+08 – Sakhalin Island | Canonical | +11:00 | +11:00 | +11 | | europe | |
| RU | Asia/Srednekolymsk | MSK+08 – Sakha (E), N Kuril Is | Canonical | +11:00 | +11:00 | +11 | | europe | |
| NF | Pacific/Norfolk | | Canonical | +11:00 | +12:00 | +11 | +12 | australasia | |
| | Etc/GMT-12 | | Canonical | +12:00 | +12:00 | +12 | | etcetera | Sign is intentionally inverted. See the Etc area description. |
| RU | Asia/Anadyr | MSK+09 – Bering Sea | Canonical | +12:00 | +12:00 | +12 | | europe | |
| FJ | Pacific/Fiji | | Canonical | +12:00 | +12:00 | +12 | | australasia | |
| RU | Asia/Kamchatka | MSK+09 – Kamchatka | Canonical | +12:00 | +12:00 | +12 | | europe | |
| MH | Pacific/Kwajalein | Kwajalein | Canonical | +12:00 | +12:00 | +12 | | australasia | |
| MH | Kwajalein | | Link | +12:00 | +12:00 | +12 | | backward | Link to Pacific/Kwajalein |
| NR | Pacific/Nauru | | Canonical | +12:00 | +12:00 | +12 | | australasia | |
| KI, MH, TV, UM, WF | Pacific/Tarawa | Gilberts, Marshalls, Wake | Canonical | +12:00 | +12:00 | +12 | | australasia | |
| TV | Pacific/Funafuti | | Link^{†} | +12:00 | +12:00 | +12 | | backward | Link to Pacific/Tarawa |
| MH | Pacific/Majuro | most of Marshall Islands | Link^{†} | +12:00 | +12:00 | +12 | | backward | Link to Pacific/Tarawa |
| UM | Pacific/Wake | Wake Island | Link^{†} | +12:00 | +12:00 | +12 | | backward | Link to Pacific/Tarawa |
| WF | Pacific/Wallis | | Link^{†} | +12:00 | +12:00 | +12 | | backward | Link to Pacific/Tarawa |
| NZ, AQ | Pacific/Auckland | New Zealand time | Canonical | +12:00 | +13:00 | NZST | NZDT | australasia | |
| NZ | NZ | | Link | +12:00 | +13:00 | NZST | NZDT | backward | Link to Pacific/Auckland |
| AQ | Antarctica/McMurdo | New Zealand time – McMurdo, South Pole | Link^{†} | +12:00 | +13:00 | NZST | NZDT | backward | Link to Pacific/Auckland |
| AQ | Antarctica/South_Pole | | Link | +12:00 | +13:00 | NZST | NZDT | backward | Link to Pacific/Auckland |
| NZ | Pacific/Chatham | Chatham Islands | Canonical | +12:45 | +13:45 | +1245 | +1345 | australasia | |
| NZ | NZ-CHAT | | Link | +12:45 | +13:45 | +1245 | +1345 | backward | Link to Pacific/Chatham |
| | Etc/GMT-13 | | Canonical | +13:00 | +13:00 | +13 | | etcetera | Sign is intentionally inverted. See the Etc area description. |
| WS | Pacific/Apia | | Canonical | +13:00 | +13:00 | +13 | | australasia | |
| TK | Pacific/Fakaofo | | Canonical | +13:00 | +13:00 | +13 | | australasia | |
| KI | Pacific/Kanton | Phoenix Islands | Canonical | +13:00 | +13:00 | +13 | | australasia | |
| KI | Pacific/Enderbury | | Link^{†} | +13:00 | +13:00 | +13 | | backward | Link to Pacific/Kanton |
| TO | Pacific/Tongatapu | | Canonical | +13:00 | +13:00 | +13 | | australasia | |
| | Etc/GMT-14 | | Canonical | +14:00 | +14:00 | +14 | | etcetera | Sign is intentionally inverted. See the Etc area description. |
| KI | Pacific/Kiritimati | Line Islands | Canonical | +14:00 | +14:00 | +14 | | australasia | |

== List summaries ==
Number of zones and links by region
| Region | Zones | Links | Total |
|---|---|---|---|
| Africa | 19 | 35 | 54 |
| America | 121 | 48 | 169 |
| Antarctica | 8 | 4 | 12 |
| Asia | 74 | 25 | 99 |
| Atlantic | 8 | 4 | 12 |
| Australia | 11 | 12 | 23 |
| Europe | 38 | 26 | 64 |
| Indian | 3 | 8 | 11 |
| Pacific | 30 | 14 | 44 |
| Etc | 28 | 7 | 35 |
| Other | 5 | 70 | 75 |
| Total | 345 | 253 | 598 |

Number of zones and links by source file
| File | Zones | Links | Total |
|---|---|---|---|
| factory | 1 | 0 | 1 |
| africa | 20 | 0 | 20 |
| antarctica | 6 | 0 | 6 |
| asia | 58 | 0 | 58 |
| australasia | 39 | 0 | 39 |
| etcetera | 28 | 1 | 29 |
| europe | 65 | 0 | 65 |
| northamerica | 78 | 0 | 78 |
| southamerica | 46 | 0 | 46 |
| backward | 4 | 252 | 256 |
| Total | 345 | 253 | 598 |

== See also ==
- tz database
- List of time zone abbreviations
- Abolition of time zones
