= Time in Antarctica =

Time zones of Antarctica

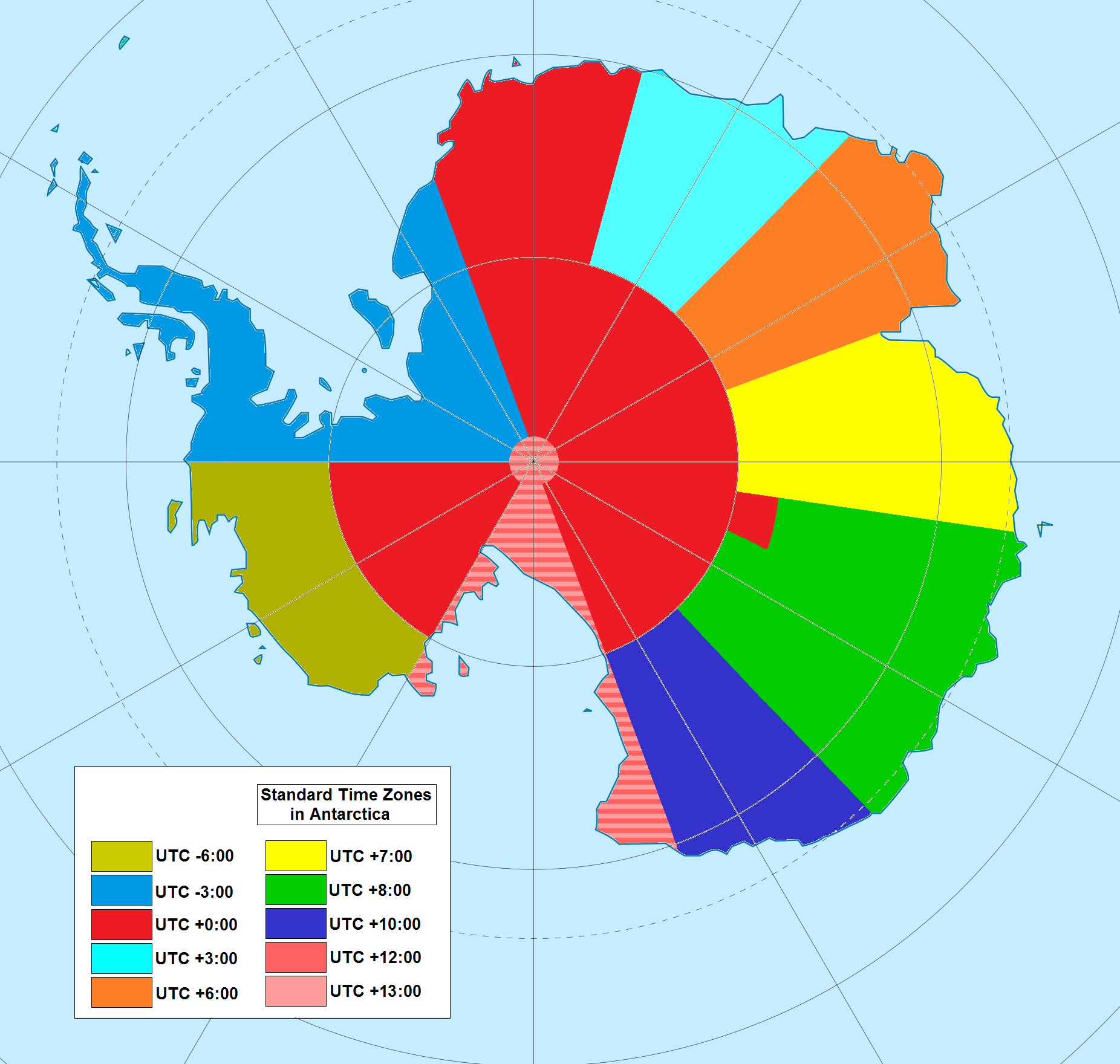
Map of approximate time zones on the continent of Antarctica. Stations could use time zones not matching the map.: UTC+00:00; UTC+03:00; UTC+06:00; UTC+07:00; UTC+08:00; UTC+10:00; UTC+12:00; UTC+13:00; UTC−06:00; UTC−03:00

Antarctica sits on every line of longitude because the South Pole is on the continent. Theoretically, Antarctica would be located in all time zones; however, areas south of the Antarctic Circle experience extreme day-night cycles near the times of the June and December solstices, making it difficult to determine which time zone would be most appropriate. For practical purposes time zones are usually based on territorial claims; however, the time zone of their supply base is often utilised (e.g., McMurdo Station and Amundsen–Scott South Pole Station use New Zealand time due to their main supply base being Christchurch, New Zealand). In most areas south of 80 degrees latitude, Coordinated Universal Time (UTC) is assumed despite the limited presence of clocks.

== TZ database ==
The file zone.tab of the tz database contains the following zones, columns marked with * contain data from the file zone.tab. Only permanently inhabited stations are tracked by the tz database staff. Some summer-only stations with different time might exist.

Country code*	Coordinates*	Zone name*	Comment*	UTC offset		Area covered
Country code*	Coordinates*	Zone name*	Comment*	Standard time	DST	Area covered
AQ	−6448−06406	Antarctica/Palmer	Palmer	−03:00	No	Palmer Land
AQ	−6734−06808	Antarctica/Rothera	Rothera	−03:00	No	Graham Land
AQ	−720041+0023206	Antarctica/Troll	Troll	+00:00	+02:00	Queen Maud Land
AQ	−690022+0393524	Antarctica/Syowa	Syowa	+03:00	No	Queen Maud Land, Enderby Land
AQ	−6736+06253	Antarctica/Mawson	Mawson	+05:00	No	Mac. Robertson Land
AQ	−7824+10654	Antarctica/Vostok	Vostok	+05:00	No	Inland Antarctica, Queen Maud Land
AQ	−6835+07758	Antarctica/Davis	Davis	+07:00	No	Wilkes Land
AQ	−6617+11031	Antarctica/Casey	Casey	+08:00	No	Wilkes Land
AQ	−6640+14001	Antarctica/DumontDUrville	Dumont-d'Urville	+10:00	No	Adélie Land, Victoria Land
AU	−5430+15857	Antarctica/Macquarie	Macquarie Island	+10:00	+11:00	Macquarie Island
AQ	−7750+16636	Antarctica/McMurdo	New Zealand time – McMurdo, South Pole	+12:00	+13:00	Ross Dependency
AQ		Antarctica/South_Pole		+12:00	+13:00	South Pole

The coordinates are latitude and longitude, and for each there are 2 or 3 digits for degrees, 2 digits for minutes and for some 2 digits for seconds.

Locations of the reference bases (Not shown: Macquarie (+10) on Macquarie Island)

== Daylight saving time ==
For the most part, daylight saving time (DST) is not observed in Antarctica. The majority (95 percent) of the continent is located south of the Antarctic Circle, and the midnight sun phenomenon renders the observation of DST unnecessary. Its usage would also further complicate communication with the claimant countries in the Northern Hemisphere.

However, a few regions such as the Ross Dependency and, formerly, Palmer Land, observe the time and use of DST of the countries they are supplied from, New Zealand and Chile, respectively. The areas have DST during the southern summer, when there is the northern winter, including January.
