= Time in Liberia =

- Time zone: Greenwich Mean Time
- Initials: GMT
- UTC offset: UTC+00:00
- Adopted: 7 January 1972

Daylight saving time
- DST not observed

tz database
- Africa/Monrovia

Time in Liberia is given by a single time zone, denoted as Greenwich Mean Time (GMT; UTC+00:00). Liberia shares this time zone with several other countries, including fourteen in western Africa where it was formerly known as Western Sahara Standard Time (WSST). Liberia has never observed daylight saving time (DST).

== History ==
Liberia first adopted the UTC offset -0:43:08 (called Liberia Mean Time; LMT) as it was the geographical central meridian on which the capital Monrovia was located. The time zone was renamed to Monrovia Mean Time in 1882. In March 1919, the offset was redefined forward by 1 minute and 22 seconds to -0:44:30. Liberia adopted Greenwich Mean Time (GMT; UTC+00:00) on 7 January 1972.

== IANA time zone database ==
In the IANA time zone database, Liberia is given one zone in the file zone.tab – Africa/Monrovia. "LR" refers to the country's ISO 3166-1 alpha-2 country code. Data for Liberia directly from zone.tab of the IANA time zone database; columns marked with * are the columns from zone.tab itself:

c.c.*	coordinates*	TZ*	Comments	UTC offset	DST
LR	+0618−01047	Africa/Monrovia		+00:00	+00:00

== See also ==
- List of time zones by country
- List of UTC time offsets
