= Time in the Republic of the Congo =

- Time zone: West Africa Time
- Initials: WAT
- UTC offset: UTC+01:00

Daylight saving time
- DST not observed

tz database
- Africa/Brazzaville

The Republic of the Congo observes a single time zone year-round, denoted as West Africa Time (WAT; UTC+01:00).

== IANA time zone database ==
In the IANA time zone database, the Congo is given one zone in the file zone.tab—Africa/Brazzaville. "CG" refers to the country's ISO 3166-1 alpha-2 country code. Data for the Congo directly from zone.tab of the IANA time zone database; columns marked with * are the columns from zone.tab itself:

c.c.*	coordinates*	TZ*	Comments	UTC offset	DST
CG	−0416+01517	Africa/Brazzaville		+01:00	+01:00

== See also ==
- Time in Africa
- Time in the Democratic Republic of the Congo
- List of time zones by country
