= Bhutan Time =

Time zone of Bhutan

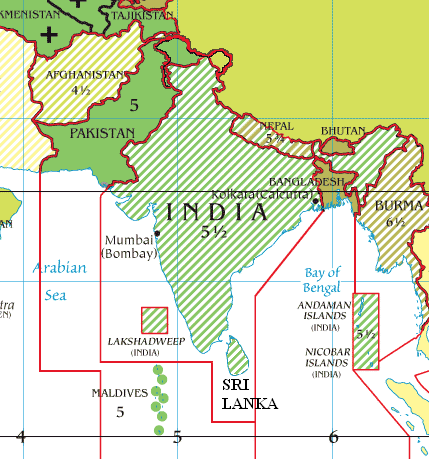
BTT in relation with the bordering nations.

Bhutan Time (BTT), the time zone used in Bhutan, is six ahead of UTC (UTC+06:00). Bhutan does not observe Daylight saving time.

== IANA time zone database ==
The IANA time zone database contains one zone for Bhutan in the file zone.tab, which is named Asia/Thimphu.

== See also ==
- Bangladesh Standard Time
