= Time in São Tomé and Príncipe =

- Time zone: Greenwich Mean Time
- Initials: GMT
- UTC offset: UTC+00:00
- Adopted: 1 January 1912–1 January 2018; 1 January 2019 (readopted)

Daylight saving time
- DST not observed

tz database
- Africa/Sao_Tome

Time in the island country of São Tomé and Príncipe is given by Greenwich Mean Time (GMT; UTC+00:00). São Tomé and Príncipe has never observed daylight saving time.

== History ==
Under Portuguese rule, São Tomé and Príncipe first observed the local mean time UTC+0:26:56 until 1884, when it adopted UTC-0:36:45. GMT (UTC+00:00) was adopted on 1 January 1912. The country briefly adopted West Africa Time (WAT; UTC+01:00) on 1 January 2018, but reverted back on 1 January the following year.

== IANA time zone database ==
In the IANA time zone database, São Tomé and Príncipe is given one zone in the file zone.tab – Africa/Sao_Tome. "ST" refers to the country's ISO 3166-1 alpha-2 country code. Data for São Tomé and Príncipe directly from zone.tab of the IANA time zone database; columns marked with * are the columns from zone.tab itself:

c.c.*	coordinates*	TZ*	Comments	UTC offset	DST
ST	+0020+00644	Africa/Sao_Tome		+00:00	+00:00
