= Time in Moldova =

Time in Europe: Light Blue / Western European Time / Greenwich Mean Time (UTC); Blue / Western European Time / Greenwich Mean Time (UTC); Blue / Western European Summer Time / British Summer Time / Irish Standard Time (UTC+1); Red / Central European Time (UTC+1); Red / Central European Summer Time (UTC+2); Yellow / Eastern European Time / Kaliningrad Time (UTC+2); Ochre / Eastern European Time (UTC+2); Ochre / Eastern European Summer Time (UTC+3); Green / Moscow Time / Turkey Time (UTC+3); Turquoise / Armenia Time / Azerbaijan Time / Georgia Time / Samara Time (UTC+4); ▉▉▉▉ Pale hues: Standard time observed all year ▉▉▉ Dark hues: Daylight saving time

In Moldova, the standard time is Eastern European Time (EET; UTC+02:00). Daylight saving time, which moves one hour ahead to UTC+03:00 is observed from the last Sunday in March to the last Sunday in October.

== IANA time zone database ==
In the IANA time zone database, Moldova is given one zone in the file zone.tab – Europe/Chisinau (named after Chișinău, the capital of Moldova, but without the diacritics). Data for Moldova directly from zone.tab of the IANA time zone database; columns marked with * are the columns from zone.tab itself:

c.c.*	coordinates*	TZ*	Comments	UTC offset	DST
MD	+4700+02850	Europe/Chisinau		+02:00	+03:00

== See also ==
- Time in Europe
- List of time zones by country
- List of time zones by UTC offset
