= Time in San Marino =

- Clock tower of Palazzo Pubblico
- Time zone: Central European Time
- Initials: CET
- UTC offset: UTC+01:00

Daylight saving time
- Name: Central European Summer Time
- Initials: CEST
- UTC offset: UTC+02:00
- Start: Last Sunday in March (02:00 CET)
- End: Last Sunday in October (03:00 CEST)
- In use since: 1966

tz database
- Europe/San_Marino

In San Marino, the standard time is Central European Time (CET; UTC+01:00). Daylight saving time is observed from the last Sunday in March (02:00 CET) to the last Sunday in October (03:00 CEST). This is shared with several other EU member states.

== History ==
San Marino observed daylight saving time between 1916 and 1920, 1940, 1942 to 1948, and again since 1966.

== IANA time zone database ==
In the IANA time zone database, San Marino is given one zone in the file zone.tab – Europe/San_Marino. Data for San Marino directly from zone.tab of the IANA time zone database; columns marked with * are the columns from zone.tab itself:

c.c.*	coordinates*	TZ*	Comments	UTC offset	DST
SM	+4355+01228	Europe/San_Marino		+01:00	+02:00

== See also ==
- Time in Europe
- List of time zones by country
- List of time zones by UTC offset
