= Time in Haiti =

Time in
- Time zone: Eastern Standard Time
- Initials: EST
- UTC offset: UTC−5

Daylight saving time
- Name: Eastern Daylight Time
- Initials: EDT
- UTC offset: UTC−4
- Start: Second Sunday in March
- End: First Sunday in November

tz database
- America/Port-au-Prince

Haiti observes Eastern Standard Time Zone (UTC−5) as standard time, and Eastern Daylight Time (UTC−4) as daylight saving time (DST). DST is observed annually from the second Sunday in March to the first Sunday in November.

== IANA time zone database ==
In the IANA time zone database, Haiti is given one zone in the file zone.tab—America/Port-au-Prince. "HT" refers to the country's ISO 3166-1 alpha-2 country code. Data for Haiti directly from zone.tab of the IANA time zone database; columns marked with * are the columns from zone.tab itself:

c.c.*	coordinates*	TZ*	Comments	UTC offset	DST
HT	+1832−07220	America/Port-au-Prince		−05:00	−04:00
