= Time in Barbados =

- Time zone: Atlantic Standard Time
- Initials: AST
- UTC offset: UTC−4

Daylight saving time
- DST not observed

tz database
- America/Barbados

Barbados observes Atlantic Standard Time (UTC−4) year-round.

== IANA time zone database ==
In the IANA time zone database, Barbados is given one zone in the file zone.tab—America/Barbados. "BB" refers to the country's ISO 3166-1 alpha-2 country code. Data for Barbados directly from zone.tab of the IANA time zone database; columns marked with * are the columns from zone.tab itself:

c.c.*	coordinates*	TZ*	Comments	UTC offset	DST
BB	+1306−05937	America/Barbados		−04:00	−04:00
