= Time in Hungary =

Hungary is in the Central European Time (CET; Hungarian: Közép-európai idő) zone, which is one hour ahead of Coordinated Universal Time (UTC). The country observes Daylight Saving Time (DST). DST was first introduced in Hungary in 1916 and was observed until 1919. It was also in use between 1941–1949 and 1954–1957. DST has been in use again since 1980.

Hungary is represented in the IANA time zone database under the entry Europe/Budapest, in the file zone.tab.

== Notation ==
In Hungary, the 24-hour clock is used in formal or informal settings, while the 12-hour clock is predominantly used informally. The time format is typically expressed as "hh óra mm perc," but the numeric forms "hh.mm" or "hh:mm" are also acceptable. Example:

- 10.35 or 10:35
