= Time in Guatemala =

- Time zone: Central Standard Time
- Initials: CST
- UTC offset: UTC−6

Daylight saving time
- DST not observed

tz database
- America/Guatemala

Guatemala observes Central Standard Time (UTC−6) year-round. The country has observed this time zone since October 5, 1918.

== Daylight saving time ==
Guatemala observed daylight saving time in four separate periods, setting the official time one hour forward:

- from November 25, 1973, to February 24, 1974
- from May 21 to September 22, 1983
- from March 23 to September 7, 1991
- from April 30 to October 1, 2006.

The clock change in 1973 was made in response to the 1970s energy crisis.

The clock change in 2006 was intended to reduce the consumers' spending on energy bills. While Guatemala observed five months of daylight saving time in 2006, according to the Ministerio de Energía y Minas (MEM), nationwide energy consumption was reduced by 36 million kilowatt-hours, equivalent to monetary savings of Q64 million. Guatemala intended to observe daylight saving time the following year, but the plan never came through.

== IANA time zone database ==
In the IANA time zone database, Guatemala is given one zone in the file zone.tab—America/Guatemala. "GT" refers to the country's ISO 3166-1 alpha-2 country code. Data for Guatemala directly from zone.tab of the IANA time zone database; columns marked with * are the columns from zone.tab itself:

c.c.*	coordinates*	TZ*	Comments	UTC offset	DST
GT	+1438−09031	America/Guatemala		−06:00	−06:00
