= Time in Eritrea =

- Time zone: East Africa Time
- Initials: EAT
- UTC offset: UTC+03:00
- Adopted: 1993

Daylight saving time
- DST not observed

tz database
- Africa/Asmara

Time in Eritrea is in a single time zone, officially denoted as East Africa Time (EAT; UTC+03:00). Eritrea has never observed daylight saving time. It has consistently observed EAT since its independence in 1993.

== IANA time zone database ==
In the IANA time zone database, Eritrea is given one zone in the file zone.tab – Africa/Asmara. "ER" refers to the country's ISO 3166-1 alpha-2 country code. Data for Eritrea directly from zone.tab of the IANA time zone database; columns marked with * are the columns from zone.tab itself:

c.c.*	coordinates*	TZ*	Comments	UTC offset	DST
ER	+1520+03853	Africa/Asmara		+03:00	+03:00

== See also ==
- List of time zones by country
- List of UTC time offsets
- Time in Ethiopia
