= Time in Rwanda =

- Time zone: Central Africa Time
- Initials: CAT
- UTC offset: UTC+02:00
- Time notation: 24-hour clock

Daylight saving time
- DST not observed

tz database
- Africa/Kigali

Time in Rwanda is given by a single time zone, officially denoted as Central Africa Time (CAT; UTC+02:00). Rwanda has never observed daylight saving time.

== IANA time zone database ==
In the IANA time zone database, Rwanda is given one zone in the file zone.tab – Africa/Kigali. "RW" refers to the country's ISO 3166-1 alpha-2 country code. Data for Rwanda directly from zone.tab of the IANA time zone database; columns marked with * are the columns from zone.tab itself:

| c.c.* | coordinates* | TZ* | Comments | UTC offset | DST |
|---|---|---|---|---|---|
| RW | −0157+03004 | Africa/Kigali | | +02:00 | +02:00 |

== See also ==
- Time in Africa
- List of time zones by country
- List of UTC time offsets
