= Time in Sierra Leone =

- Time zone: Greenwich Mean Time
- Initials: GMT
- UTC offset: UTC+00:00
- Adopted: 1939

Daylight saving time
- DST not observed

tz database
- Africa/Freetown

Time in Sierra Leone is given by Greenwich Mean Time (GMT; UTC+00:00). Sierra Leone has never observed daylight saving time. Sierra Leone adopted its current time zone in 1939, switching from UTC−01:00.

== IANA time zone database ==
In the IANA time zone database, Sierra Leone is given one zone in the file zone.tab – Africa/Freetown. "SL" refers to the country's ISO 3166-1 alpha-2 country code. Data for Sierra Leone directly from zone.tab of the IANA time zone database; columns marked with * are the columns from zone.tab itself:

c.c.*	coordinates*	TZ*	Comments	UTC offset	DST
SL	+0830−01315	Africa/Freetown		+00:00	+00:00
