= Time in Burkina Faso =

- Time zone: Greenwich Mean Time
- Initials: GMT
- UTC offset: UTC+00:00

Daylight saving time
- DST not observed

tz database
- Africa/Ouagadougou

Time in Burkina Faso is given by a single time zone, denoted as Greenwich Mean Time (GMT; UTC+00:00). Burkina Faso shares this time zone with several other countries, including fourteen in western Africa. Burkina Faso does not observe daylight saving time (DST).

== IANA time zone database ==
In the IANA time zone database, Burkina Faso is given one zone in the file zone.tab—Africa/Ouagadougou. "BF" refers to the country's ISO 3166-1 alpha-2 country code. Data for Burkina Faso directly from zone.tab of the IANA time zone database; columns marked with * are the columns from zone.tab itself:

c.c.*	coordinates*	TZ*	Comments	UTC offset	DST
BF	+1222−00131	Africa/Ouagadougou		+00:00	+00:00

== See also ==
- Time in Africa
- List of time zones by country
