= Yekaterinburg Time =

Time zone in Russia (UTC+5)

- Time zone
- Clock in Yekaterinburg

UTC offset
- YEKT: UTC+05:00

Current time
- 15:15, 23 September 2026 YEKT [refresh]

Observance of DST
- DST is not observed in this time zone.

Time in Russia: KALT / Kaliningrad Time / UTC+2 / (MSK−1); MSK / Moscow Time / UTC+3 / (MSK±0); SAMT / Samara Time / UTC+4 / (MSK+1); YEKT / Yekaterinburg Time / UTC+5 / (MSK+2); OMST / Omsk Time / UTC+6 / (MSK+3); KRAT / Krasnoyarsk Time / UTC+7 / (MSK+4); IRKT / Irkutsk Time / UTC+8 / (MSK+5); YAKT / Yakutsk Time / UTC+9 / (MSK+6); VLAT / Vladivostok Time / UTC+10 / (MSK+7); MAGT / Magadan Time / UTC+11 / (MSK+8); PETT / Kamchatka Time / UTC+12 / (MSK+9)

Yekaterinburg Time (YEKT) is the time zone five hours ahead of UTC (UTC+05:00) and 2 hours ahead of Moscow Time (MSK+2).

In 2011, Russia moved to year-round daylight saving time. Instead of switching between UTC+05:00 in winter and UTC+06:00 in summer, Yekaterinburg time was set to UTC+06:00 until 2014, when it was reset back to UTC+05:00 year-round.

The time zone applies to the Ural Federal District, and Bashkortostan, Orenburg Oblast and Perm Krai in the Volga Federal District.

== IANA time zone database ==
In the zone.tab of the IANA time zone database, the zone with the same current offset is:

c.c.	Coordinates	Timezone name	Comments	UTC offset
RU	+5651+06036	Asia/Yekaterinburg	MSK+02 – Urals	+05:00

== See also ==
- Time in Russia
