= Time in Togo =

- Time zone: Greenwich Mean Time
- Initials: GMT
- UTC offset: UTC+00:00
- Adopted: 1907

Daylight saving time
- DST not observed

tz database
- Africa/Lome

Time in Togo is given by Greenwich Mean Time (GMT; UTC+00:00). Togo has never observed daylight saving time and adopted this time zone in 1907.

== IANA time zone database ==
In the IANA time zone database, Togo is given one zone in the file zone.tab – Africa/Lome. "TG" refers to the country's ISO 3166-1 alpha-2 country code. Data for Togo directly from zone.tab of the IANA time zone database; columns marked with * are the columns from zone.tab itself:

c.c.*	coordinates*	TZ*	Comments	UTC offset	DST
TG	+0608+00113	Africa/Lome		+00:00	+00:00
