= Time in Chad =

- Time zone: West Africa Time
- Initials: WAT
- UTC offset: UTC+01:00

Daylight saving time
- DST not observed

tz database
- Africa/Ndjamena

Time in Chad is given by a single time zone, denoted as West Africa Time (WAT; UTC+01:00). Chad shares this time zone with several other countries in western Africa. Chad does not observe daylight saving time (DST).

== IANA time zone database ==
In the IANA time zone database, Chad is given one zone in the file zone.tab—Africa/Ndjamena. "TD" refers to the country's ISO 3166-1 alpha-2 country code. Data for Chad directly from zone.tab of the IANA time zone database; columns marked with * are the columns from zone.tab itself:

c.c.*	coordinates*	TZ*	Comments	UTC offset	DST
TD	+1207+01503	Africa/Ndjamena		+01:00	+01:00

== See also ==
- Time in Africa
- List of time zones by country
