= Time in Kiribati =

- Time zone: Gilbert Island Time, Phoenix Island Time, Line Islands Time
- Initials: GILT, PHOT, LINT
- UTC offset: UTC+12:00, +13 and +14
- Standard meridian: None, passes through the equator, 180th meridian and 150°W meridian
- Adopted: 1979 (+12); 31 December 1994 (+13 and +14)

Daylight saving time
- DST not observed

tz database
- Pacific/Kanton, Pacific/Kiritimati, Pacific/Tarawa

Kiribati, a country in Oceania comprising 32 atolls and reef islands and one raised coral island, observes three time zones, ranging from UTC+12:00 to +14. Kiribati does not observe daylight saving time.

The three given time zones are for the three primary island groups that form Kiribati, and their associated atolls: Gilbert Island Time (GILT; UTC+12:00), Phoenix Island Time (PHOT; UTC+13:00) and Line Islands Time (LINT; UTC+14:00). UTC+14:00 is the most advanced time zone in the world, making Kiribati one of the first countries to celebrate a New Year, although Samoa also used to observe UTC+14:00 during their daylight saving time, but not since 2021.

Although Kiribati spans both the equator and the 180th meridian, the International Date Line goes around Kiribati and swings far to the east, almost reaching the 150°W meridian. This was the result of the Phoenix and Line Islands switching in 1994 from UTC−11:00 and −10 to UTC+13:00 and +14 respectively.

== History ==
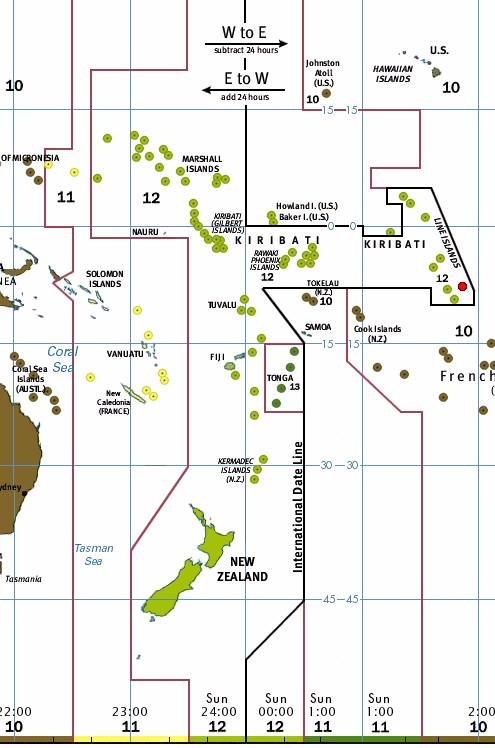
Following a 1995 time zone realignment, Millennium Island (then Caroline Island) (red dot at far east of map) became the easternmost land west of the International Date Line.

When the Republic of Kiribati was founded in 1979, it had three time zones: UTC+12:00 in the Gilbert Islands, UTC−11:00 in the Phoenix Islands and UTC−10:00 in the Line Islands. Gilbert was west of the international dateline and the Phoenix and Line Islands were east of it. This meant that the Gilbert Islands were nearly a full day ahead of the eastern islands.

For administrative purposes, the time zones had to be adjusted. To solve it, the government of Kiribati introduced a change of date for its eastern half on 31 December 1994, from time zones UTC−11:00 and UTC−10:00 to UTC+13:00 and UTC+14:00. Before this, UTC+13:00 and UTC+14:00 did not exist.

The revision of Kiribati's time zone meant that the international date line in effect moved 1,000 kilometers (620 mi) eastwards to go around this country, so that the Line Islands, including the inhabited Kiritimati island, started the year 2000 on its territory before any other country on Earth, a feature the Kiribati government capitalised on as a potential tourist draw.

== IANA time zone database ==
The IANA time zone database in the file zone.tab contains three time zones for Kiribati. Data below is for Kiribati directly from zone.tab of the IANA time zone database. Columns marked with * are the columns from zone.tab itself:

c.c.*	coordinates*	TZ*	Comments	UTC offset	DST
KI	−0247−17143	Pacific/Kanton	Phoenix Islands	+13:00	+13:00
KI	+0152−15720	Pacific/Kiritimati	Line Islands	+14:00	+14:00
KI	+0125+17300	Pacific/Tarawa	Gilberts, Marshalls, Wake	+12:00	+12:00
