= Time in Cyprus =

Time in Cyprus is given by Eastern European Time (EET) (UTC+02:00) or Eastern European Summer Time (EEST) (UTC+03:00) during the summer.

In 2016, the northern part that is occupied by the Turkish Republic of Northern Cyprus had different time to the Republic of Cyprus during the winter, meaning it followed Turkey which starting summer 2016 has UTC+3 all year around. From October 2017 it has same time as the rest of Cyprus, that means DST during summer but not winter. That is a different time compared to Turkey during the winter.

== IANA time zone database ==
The zones for Cyprus as given by zone.tab of the IANA time zone database.

c.c.	Coordinates	Timezone name	Comments	UTC offset (Std.)	UTC offset (DST)
CY	+3510+03322	Asia/Nicosia	most of Cyprus	+02:00	+03:00
CY	+3507+03357	Asia/Famagusta	Northern Cyprus	+02:00	+03:00
