= Time in Nauru =

Time in Nauru is given by Nauru Standard Time (NRT, UTC+11:00) or Nauru Alternate Time (UTC+11:00).

== Description ==
Nauru has three official time zones. Nauru Standard Time (NRT, UTC+11:00) and Nauru Alternate Time (UTC+11:00). The Nauru Standard Time Act 1978 also lists UTC+11:30 as Present Time. As of 2011, all three time zones may be used. However, Nauru Standard Time is most commonly listed as the time zone for Nauru.

Nauru does not have an associated daylight saving time.

== History ==
In 1978, the Nauru Standard Time Act 1978 was passed, establishing Nauru Standard Time as UTC+11:00, Nauru Alternate Time as UTC+12:00, and Present Time as UTC+11:30. The act was reconsolidated in 2011.

== IANA time zone database ==
In the IANA time zone database, Nauru is given the time zone Pacific/Nauru.

c.c.*	coordinates*	TZ*	Comments	UTC offset	DST
NR	−0031+16655	Pacific/Nauru		+12:00	+12:00
