= Time in the Federated States of Micronesia =

The Federated States of Micronesia, a country in Oceania consisting of around 607 islands, observes two time zones, UTC+10:00 in its western part, and UTC+11:00 in its eastern part. Micronesia does not have an associated daylight saving time.

Micronesia lies just north of the equator, west of the International Date Line.

== IANA time zone database ==
In the IANA time zone database, Micronesia is given the following three time zones:

c.c.*	coordinates*	TZ*	Comments	UTC offset	DST
FM	+0725+15147	Pacific/Chuuk	Chuuk/Truk, Yap	+10:00	+10:00
FM	+0519+16259	Pacific/Kosrae	Kosrae	+11:00	+11:00
FM	+0658+15813	Pacific/Pohnpei	Pohnpei/Ponape	+11:00	+11:00
