= Time in the Marshall Islands =

Time in the Marshall Islands, an island country consisting of over 29 coral atolls, is given by Marshall Islands Time (MHT; UTC+12:00). The Marshall Islands does not have an associated daylight saving time.

It is located near the equator, slightly west of the International Date Line.

== History ==
The Kwajalein Atoll of the Marshall Islands formerly observed UTC-12:00, which made communicating and trading with the other atolls observing UTC+12:00 a day ahead highly problematic. Due to this, the Kwajalein Atoll advanced 24 hours to the Eastern Hemisphere side of the International Date Line by skipping 21 August 1993.

== IANA time zone database ==
The IANA time zone database gives the Marshall Islands two zones:

c.c.*	coordinates*	TZ*	Comments	UTC offset	DST
MH	+0905+16720	Pacific/Kwajalein	Kwajalein	+12:00	+12:00
MH	+0709+17112	Pacific/Majuro	most of Marshall Islands	+12:00	+12:00
