= Time in New Zealand =

Time zone	Standard time	Daylight time
New Zealand	UTC+12:00	UTC+13:00
Chatham Islands	UTC+12:45	UTC+13:45

Time in New Zealand is divided by law into two standard time zones. The main islands use New Zealand Standard Time (NZST), 12 hours in advance of Coordinated Universal Time (UTC) / military M (Mike), while the outlying Chatham Islands use Chatham Standard Time (CHAST), 12 hours 45 minutes in advance of UTC / military M^ (Mike-Three).

During summer months – from the last Sunday in September until the first Sunday in April – daylight saving time (DST) is observed and clocks are advanced one hour. New Zealand Daylight Time (NZDT) is 13 hours ahead of UTC, and Chatham Daylight Time (CHADT) 13 hours 45 minutes ahead.

New Zealand's associated states – the Cook Islands and Niue – and the dependent territory of Tokelau use several different time zones at their own discretion.

== History ==
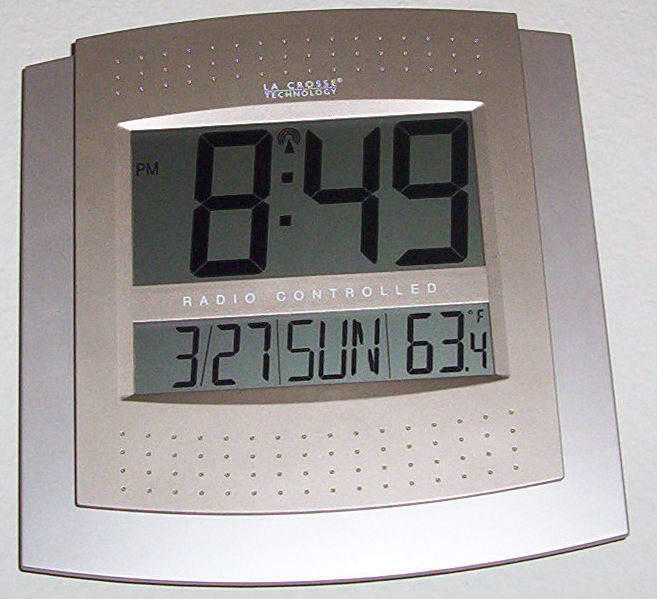
The use of atomic clocks, which measure time extremely accurately, led to the adoption of UTC, which was incorporated into New Zealand law in 1974.

On 2 November 1868, New Zealand officially adopted a standard time to be observed nationally, the first country to do so. It was based on longitude 172° 30′ East of Greenwich, 11 1/2 hours ahead of Greenwich Mean Time (GMT). This standard was known as New Zealand Mean Time (NZMT). By at least the late 1920s the Chatham Islands were using a time 45 minutes ahead of mainland New Zealand.

In 1941, during the Second World War, clocks were advanced half an hour to reduce electric power use, putting New Zealand 12 hours ahead of GMT. This was made permanent from 1946 by the Standard Time Act 1945, at which the time at the 180°E meridian was made the basis for New Zealand Time. NZST remained half an hour ahead of NZMT, and the Chatham Islands 45 minutes ahead of NZST.

Chatham Standard Time was officially established by the Standard Time Amendment Act 1956. It is one of three time zones with a 45-minute offset from UTC, the others being Nepal Standard Time (UTC+05:45) and the unofficial Australian Central Western Time (UTC+08:45).

In the late 1940s the atomic clock was developed and several laboratories began atomic time scales. A new time scale known as Coordinated Universal Time (UTC) was adopted internationally in 1972. This was based on the readings of atomic clocks, updated periodically in accordance with time variations in the Earth's rotation by the addition or deletion of seconds (called leap seconds). The Time Act 1974 defines New Zealand Standard Time as 12 hours in advance of UTC.

In 2011, the New Zealand dependency of Tokelau moved its time zone forward by 24 hours, by skipping 30 December, to be in the UTC+13:00 time zone, the same zone as New Zealand daylight saving.

== Daylight saving time ==
Starting in 1909, member of the New Zealand parliament Thomas Sidey annually put forward a bill to advance the clocks an hour for the period September to March, eventually succeeding with the Summer Time Act 1927. In 1927, clocks were advanced by an hour from first Sunday in November to the first Sunday in March. This proved unpopular, so the Summer Time Act 1928 revised this to a half-hour shift from 14 October 1928 (second Sunday) to 17 March 1929 (third Sunday), then the Summer Time Act 1929 permanently fixed this half-hour shift to run from the second Sunday in October to the third Sunday in March every year. In 1933, the period was extended from the last Sunday in September to the last Sunday in April. This continued until the Second World War, when emergency regulations in 1941 extended daylight saving to cover the whole year with annual re-applications until the Standard Time Act 1945 made the abandonment of NZMT permanent in 1946, so that 180° becomes the base longitude and what was called NZ Summer Time (NZST) became NZ Standard Time. Daylight saving effectively stopped at this time.

The strongest opposition to daylight saving has come from dairy farmers, due to disrupted schedules and shorter working times.

The Time Act 1974 empowered the governor-general to declare by Order in Council a period when daylight saving time is to be observed. Daylight saving was trialled in 1974. This was a one-hour shift (on top of the earlier half-hour shift) from the first Sunday in November to the last Sunday in February. It was changed the next year by the New Zealand Time Order 1975, which fixed the period of observance from the last Sunday in October to the first Sunday in March. Daylight saving was famously opposed in the small Kaipara dairy farming community of Ararua, which refused to adjust its clocks for some years.

In 1985 the Department of Internal Affairs conducted a comprehensive survey on public attitudes towards NZDT (New Zealand Daylight Time) and its effects on work, recreation and particular groups of people in society. The survey indicated that 76.2% of the population wanted NZDT either continued or extended. The survey also concluded that opinion on the topic differed little between sexes, and that support for NZDT was generally higher in urban centres. Support for shortening or abolishing NZDT was always in the minority in the areas surveyed.

As a consequence of the survey and further feedback from the public, in 1988 the Minister of Internal Affairs arranged for a trial period of extended NZDT to be held from the second Sunday in October 1989 to the third Sunday in March 1990. The Minister invited the public to write to him with their views on the five-week extension. The Daylight Time Order 1990 declared that NZDT would run from 02:00 NZST on the first Sunday in October to 03:00 NZDT on the third Sunday in March.

In 2007 the government extended the daylight saving period from 24 to 27 weeks. Since September 2007, daylight saving has begun at 02:00 NZST on the last Sunday in September, and ended at 03:00 NZDT (or 02:00 NZST as defined in the 1974 Act) on the first Sunday in April.

New Zealand time, including DST, is used by several Antarctic bases that are supplied from New Zealand. This results in the oddity that the Amundsen–Scott South Pole Station sets its clocks an hour further ahead during the southern summer, when the sun is constantly above the horizon, than in the southern winter, when the sun is constantly below the horizon. The extreme geographic position of the base means that no possible adjustment of the daily activity cycle can have any effect on the amount of sunlight received during those activities. However, the arrangement presumably makes real time communications with New Zealand more practical, particularly in dealing with offices.

The other countries in the Realm of New Zealand – Cook Islands, Niue, and Tokelau – do not maintain DST. Two of them are on the other side of the International Date Line and have 22–24 hours time difference to New Zealand.

== Standards ==
New Zealand standard time is based on Coordinated Universal Time (UTC) and is maintained by the government-owned Measurement Standards Laboratory. UTC is kept within 200 nanoseconds of the international atomic time scale maintained by the International Bureau of Weights and Measures in Paris. It is disseminated by various means, including time pips broadcast on Radio New Zealand, a talking clock and a Network Time Protocol service.

== Dependencies and associated states ==
Time zone	Standard time	Daylight time
Tokelau	UTC+13:00	
Cook Islands	UTC−10:00	
Niue	UTC−11:00	
Ross Dependency	UTC+12:00	UTC+13:00

There are two associated states of New Zealand in the Pacific Ocean, both on the other side of the International Date Line. The Cook Islands are in the UTC−10:00 time zone or Military W (Whiskey) and do not observe daylight saving time. Clocks in the Cook Islands are 22 or 23 hours behind New Zealand: at noon on Thursday in New Zealand, it is 13:00 or 14:00 on Wednesday in the Cook Islands.

Niue is in the UTC−11:00 time zone or Military X (X-ray) and does not observe daylight saving time. Clocks in Niue are 23 or 24 hours behind New Zealand: at noon on Thursday in New Zealand, it is noon or 1 pm on Wednesday in Niue.

The New Zealand dependency of Tokelau is in the UTC+13:00 time zone or Military M' (Mike Prime) and does not observe daylight saving time. Clocks in Tokelau are set to the same time as or 1 hour ahead of New Zealand: at noon on Thursday in New Zealand, it is noon or 13:00 on Thursday in Tokelau.

The Ross Dependency, McMurdo Station and Amundsen–Scott South Pole Station in Antarctica maintain NZST/NZDT.

== IANA time zone database ==
The zones for New Zealand, its dependencies, and its associated states as given by zone.tab of the IANA time zone database.

c.c.	Coordinates	Timezone name	Comments	UTC offset (Std.)	UTC offset (DST)
NZ	−3652+17446	Pacific/Auckland	New Zealand time	+12:00	+13:00
NZ	−4357−17633	Pacific/Chatham	Chatham Islands	+12:45	+13:45
TK	−0922−17114	Pacific/Fakaofo		+13:00	
CK	−2114−15946	Pacific/Rarotonga		−10:00	
NU	−1901−16955	Pacific/Niue		−11:00	
AQ	−7750+16636	Antarctica/McMurdo	New Zealand time – McMurdo, South Pole	+12:00	+13:00
