= Time in Alaska =

Time zones in North America

Alaska is officially covered by two time zones - the Alaska Time Zone and the Hawaii–Aleutian Time Zone. The Hawaii–Aleutian Time Zone is used for the Aleutian Islands west of 169°30′W (Islands of Four Mountains, Andreanof Islands, Rat Islands and Near Islands), and the rest of the state uses the Alaska Time Zone. The entirety of Alaska observes daylight saving time.

The town of Hyder, because it essentially is a single town split by the border between the United States and Canada, unofficially observes Pacific Time including DST (UTC−08:00, DST UTC−07:00) like its neighbor Stewart, British Columbia, with the exception of the U.S. Post Office (because it is a federal facility).

== History ==
As part of Russian America, Alaska used the Julian calendar and the same day of the week as Asia. In 1867, Alaska became a United States territory (through the Alaska Purchase) and began using the Gregorian calendar and the same day of the week as the Americas. The switch was achieved by repeating the same day of the week and skipping eleven days of the month instead of twelve during the 19th century, so that the purchase date of Friday, October 6 (Julian) was followed once again by Friday, October 18 (instead of Saturday, October 19 in Gregorian). That change redrew the International Date Line from being east to west of the territory to realign itself from Asian to American dates.

Before time zones were introduced, every place used local observation of the sun to set its clocks, which meant that every location used a different local mean time based on its longitude. For example, Sitka, the capital of Alaska at the time, at longitude 135°20′W, had a local time equivalent to UTC+14:59 under Russia and UTC−09:01 under the United States.

In 1900, "Alaska Standard Time" was established within the territory as UTC−09:00.

In 1918, the United States Congress passed the Standard Time Act, which defined a standard time zone for Alaska - United States Standard Alaska Time, set at UTC−10:00.

On January 20, 1942, all of the United States, including Alaska, began to observe War Time. Standard time in the United States advanced by one hour and would remain so until September 25, 1945, when the act was repealed.

In 1966, Congress passed the Uniform Time Act. The Uniform Time Act introduced Daylight Saving Time uniformly in the United States, which Alaska would begin observing on April 28, 1968. The Uniform Time Act also defined four time zones that Alaska would use:

- Bering Standard Time (UTC−11:00), used by the west coast (including Nome) and the Aleutian Islands.
- Alaska–Hawaii Standard Time (UTC−10:00), used by most of Alaska, including Anchorage and Fairbanks.
- Yukon Standard Time (UTC−09:00), used by Yakutat.
- Pacific Standard Time (UTC−08:00), used by Southeast Alaska, including Juneau.

In April 1983, the Alaska Legislature approved a resolution asking the Department of Transportation to switch Alaska to use only two time zones. It was approved by Secretary of Transportation Elizabeth Dole on September 15, 1983, and took effect on October 30, 1983. Areas east of Unalaska began using the Yukon Time Zone (UTC−09:00). Most of the Aleutian Islands, previously on Bering Time, were now using Alaska–Hawaii Time. As an act of Congress was required to change the name of the time zones, the time zones did not gain their modern names (Alaska Time and Hawaii–Aleutian Time) until November 30, 1984.

=== Historic alterations ===
Period in use	Time offset from GMT/UTC (Note: The term UTC (Coordinated Universal Time) begin in use just after the introduction of Unix Time on January 1, 1970. In those days before 1970, the GMT (Greenwich Mean Time) was the term being used.)	Name of time
Wednesday, July 15, 1741 – Friday, October 6, 1867 (Julian Calendar)	GMT+14:59 (in Sitka)	Local Mean Time
Wednesday, July 15, 1741 – Friday, October 6, 1867 (Julian Calendar)	GMT+12:24 (in Aleutian Islands)	Local Mean Time
Friday, October 18, 1867 – 1900 (Gregorian Calendar)	GMT−09:01 (in Sitka)	Local Mean Time
Friday, October 18, 1867 – 1900 (Gregorian Calendar)	GMT−11:36 (in Aleutian Islands)	Local Mean Time
1900 – 1918	GMT−09:00 (including Aleutian Islands)	Alaska Standard Time
1918 – January 19, 1942	GMT−08:00 (Panhandle Areas)	Pacific Standard Time
1918 – January 19, 1942	GMT−09:00 (in Yakutat)	Yukon Standard Time
1918 – January 19, 1942	GMT−10:00	Alaska Standard Time
1918 – January 19, 1942	GMT−11:00 (Nome, and Aleutian Islands)	Bering Standard Time
January 20, 1942 – September 30, 1945	GMT−07:00 (Panhandle Areas)	Pacific War Time
January 20, 1942 – September 30, 1945	GMT−08:00 (in Yakutat)	Yukon War Time
January 20, 1942 – September 30, 1945	GMT−09:00	Alaska War Time
January 20, 1942 – September 30, 1945	GMT−10:00 (Nome, and Aleutian Islands)	Bering War Time
September 30, 1945 – March 31, 1967	GMT−08:00 (Panhandle Areas)	Pacific Standard Time
September 30, 1945 – March 31, 1967	GMT−09:00 (in Yakutat)	Yukon Standard Time
September 30, 1945 – March 31, 1967	GMT−10:00	Alaska Standard Time
September 30, 1945 – March 31, 1967	GMT−11:00 (Nome, and Aleutian Islands)	Bering Standard Time
April 1, 1967 – October 30, 1983	GMT/UTC−08:00 (Panhandle Areas)	Pacific Standard Time
April 1, 1967 – October 30, 1983	GMT/UTC−09:00 (in Yakutat)	Yukon Standard Time
April 1, 1967 – October 30, 1983	GMT/UTC−10:00	Alaska–Hawaii Standard Time
April 1, 1967 – October 30, 1983	GMT/UTC−11:00 (Nome, and Aleutian Islands)	Bering Standard Time
October 30, 1983 – present	UTC−09:00 (in Juneau)	Alaska Time Zone
October 30, 1983 – present	UTC−10:00 (in Aleutian Islands)	Hawaii–Aleutian Time Zone

== tz database ==
The tz database version 2026f contains seven time zones for Alaska for historical reasons. Today, all except America/Adak are in sync with each other.

CC	Coordinates	TZ	Comments	UTC offset	UTC offset DST	Map
US	+611305−1495401	America/Anchorage	Alaska (most areas)	−09:00	−08:00	
US	+581807−1342511	America/Juneau	Alaska – Juneau area	−09:00	−08:00	
US	+571035−1351807	America/Sitka	Alaska – Sitka area	−09:00	−08:00	
US	+550737−1313435	America/Metlakatla	Alaska – Annette Island	−09:00	−08:00	
US	+593249−1394338	America/Yakutat	Alaska – Yakutat	−09:00	−08:00	
US	+643004−1652423	America/Nome	Alaska (west)	−09:00	−08:00	
US	+515248−1763929	America/Adak	Alaska – western Aleutians	−10:00	−09:00	

== See also ==
- Time in the United States
