= Time in Trinidad and Tobago =

Trinidad and Tobago is located in the Atlantic Time Zone (UTC−04:00). The twin island nation does not observe daylight saving time.

== IANA time zone database ==
In the IANA time zone database Trinidad and Tobago has the following time zone:

- America/Port_of_Spain
