= UTC−00:44 =

Former time zone in Liberia

UTC−00:44 is an identifier for a time offset from UTC of −00:44.

== History ==
UTC−00:44 was used in Liberia until January 7, 1972. It was known as Monrovia Mean Time or Liberian Time. The exact time zone was GMT−00:43:08 (based on the longitude of Monrovia) until it was redefined as GMT−0:44 on March 1, 1919. On 7 January 1972, it was changed to UTC+00:00.
