= Time in the Democratic Republic of the Congo =

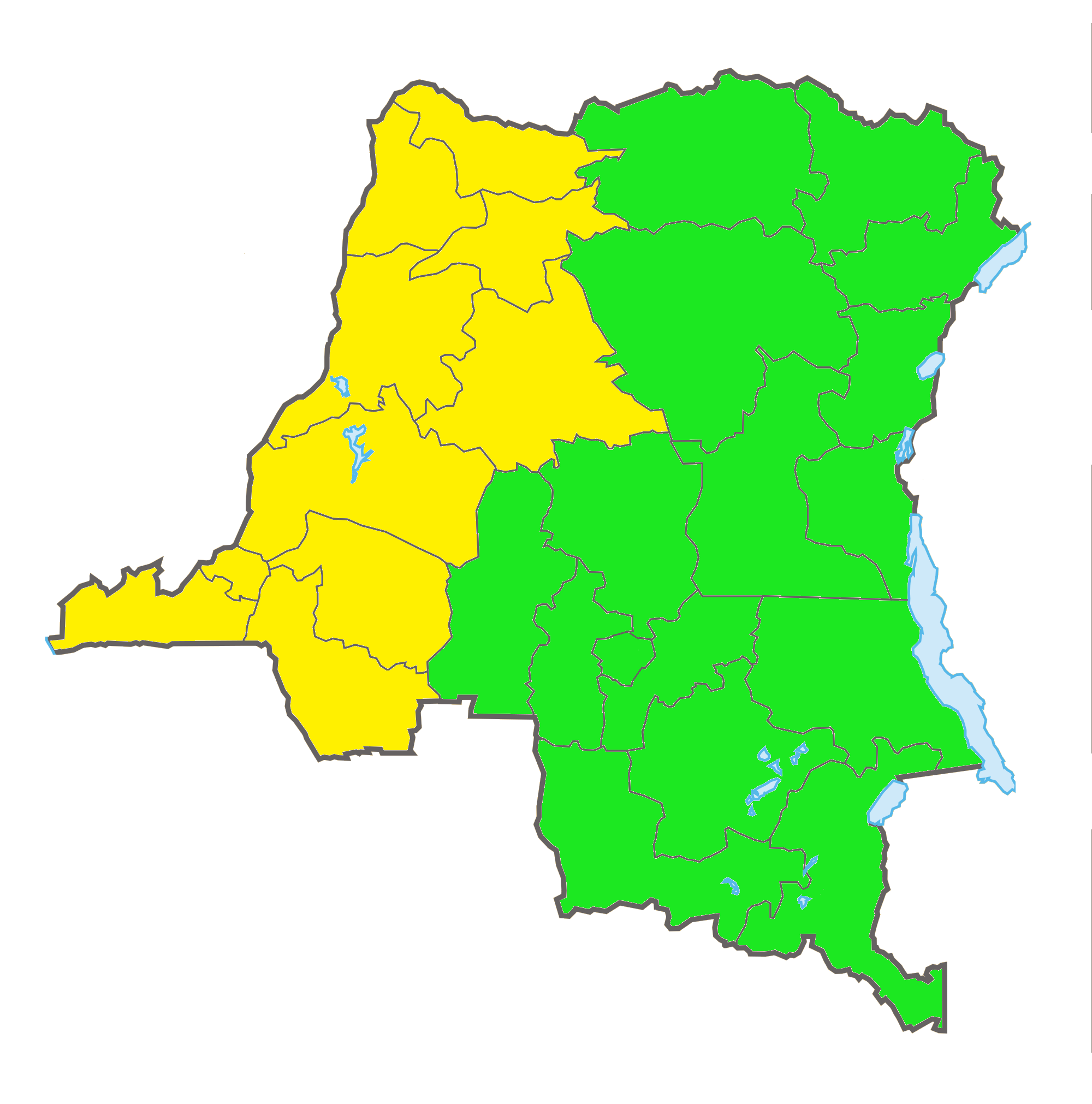
UTC+01:00, West Africa Time (WAT); UTC+02:00, Central Africa Time (CAT)

The Democratic Republic of the Congo observes UTC+01:00 (West Africa Time) and UTC+02:00 (Central Africa Time). It does not observe DST. It is the only country in Africa to use more than one time zone. About 59% of the Congolese population live in CAT (UTC+02:00).

== IANA time zone database ==
The IANA time zone database contains two zones for the country. The columns marked * contain the data from the file zone.tab of the database.

c.c.	coordinates*	TZ*	comments*	Standard time	Summer time	Notes
CD	−0418+01518	Africa/Kinshasa	Dem. Rep. of Congo (west)	+01:00	—N/a	Kinshasa, Boende, Zongo
CD	−1140+02728	Africa/Lubumbashi	Dem. Rep. of Congo (east)	+02:00	—N/a	Kindu, Bukama, Lubumbashi
