= UTC+13:45 =

Time zone

- Time zone
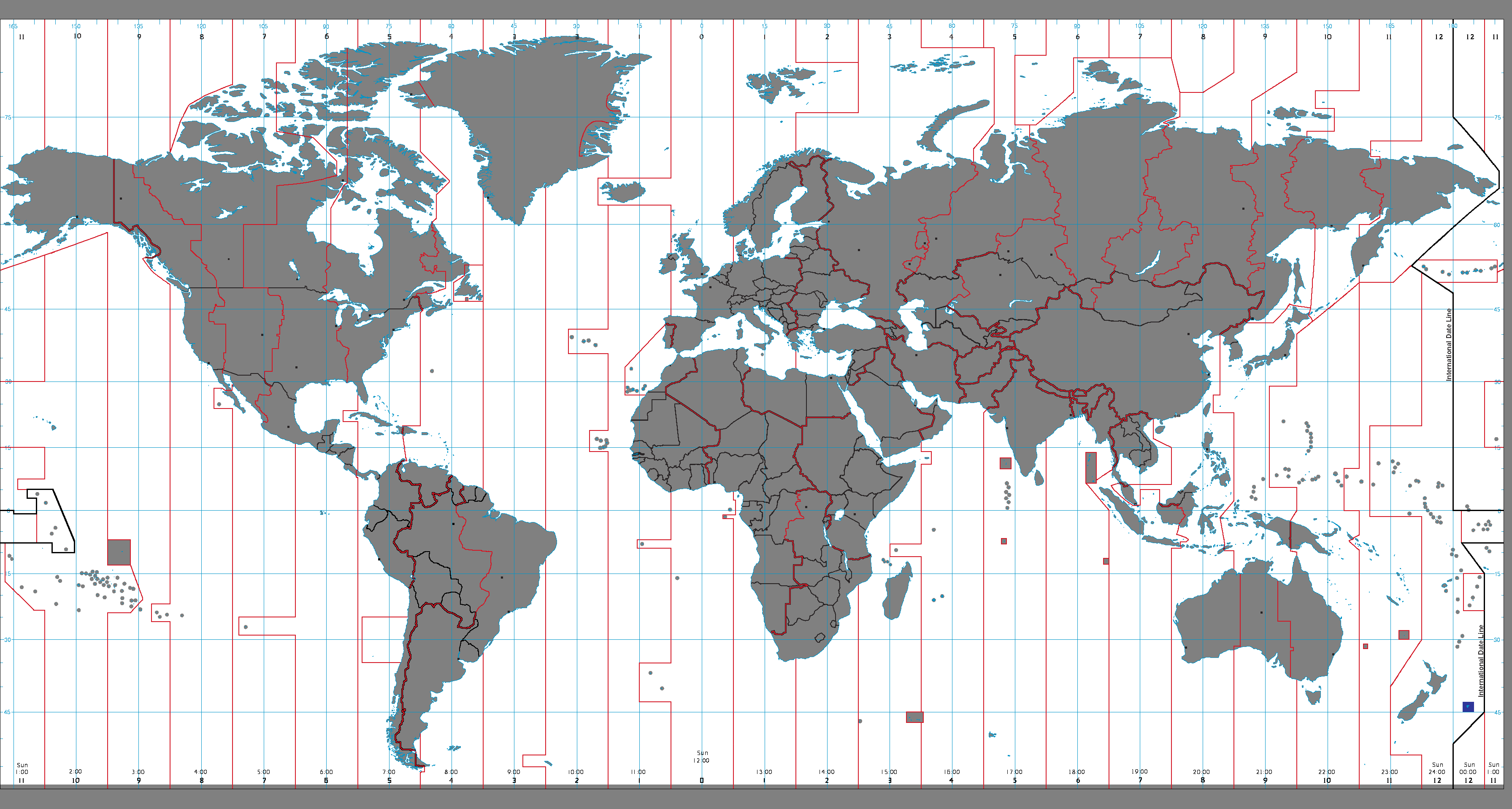
- World map with the time zone highlighted

UTC offset
- UTC: UTC+13:45

Current time
- :: UTC+13:45 [refresh]

Central meridian
- 153.75 degrees W

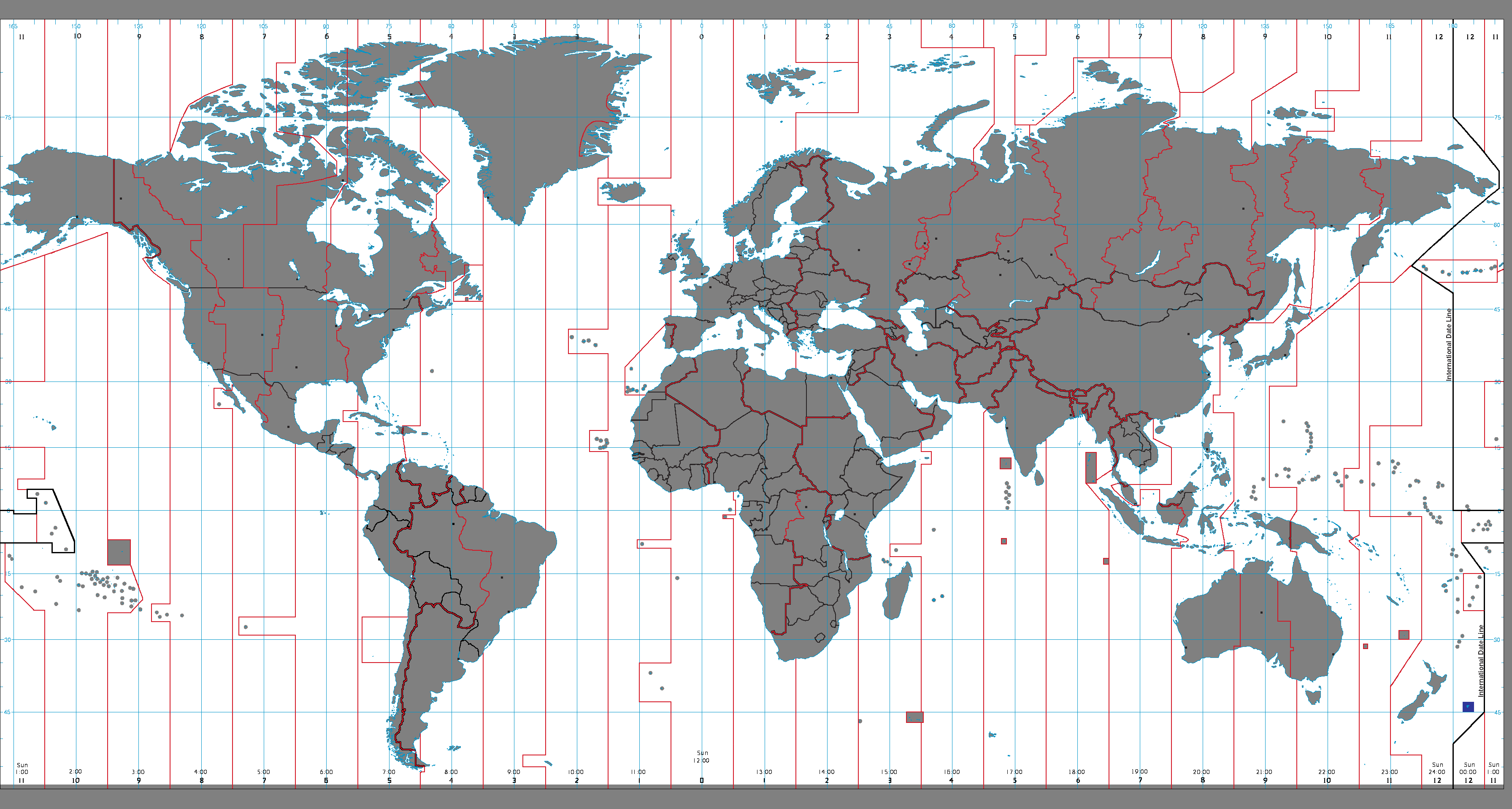
UTC+13:45: blue (December), orange (June), yellow (year-round), light blue (sea areas)

UTC+13:45 is an identifier for a time offset from UTC of +13:45.

== As daylight saving time (Southern Hemisphere summer) ==
Principal settlement: Waitangi

=== Oceania ===
- New Zealand – Chatham Daylight Time
  - Chatham Islands

== See also ==
- Time in New Zealand
