= UTC−03:00 =

Time zone

- Time zone
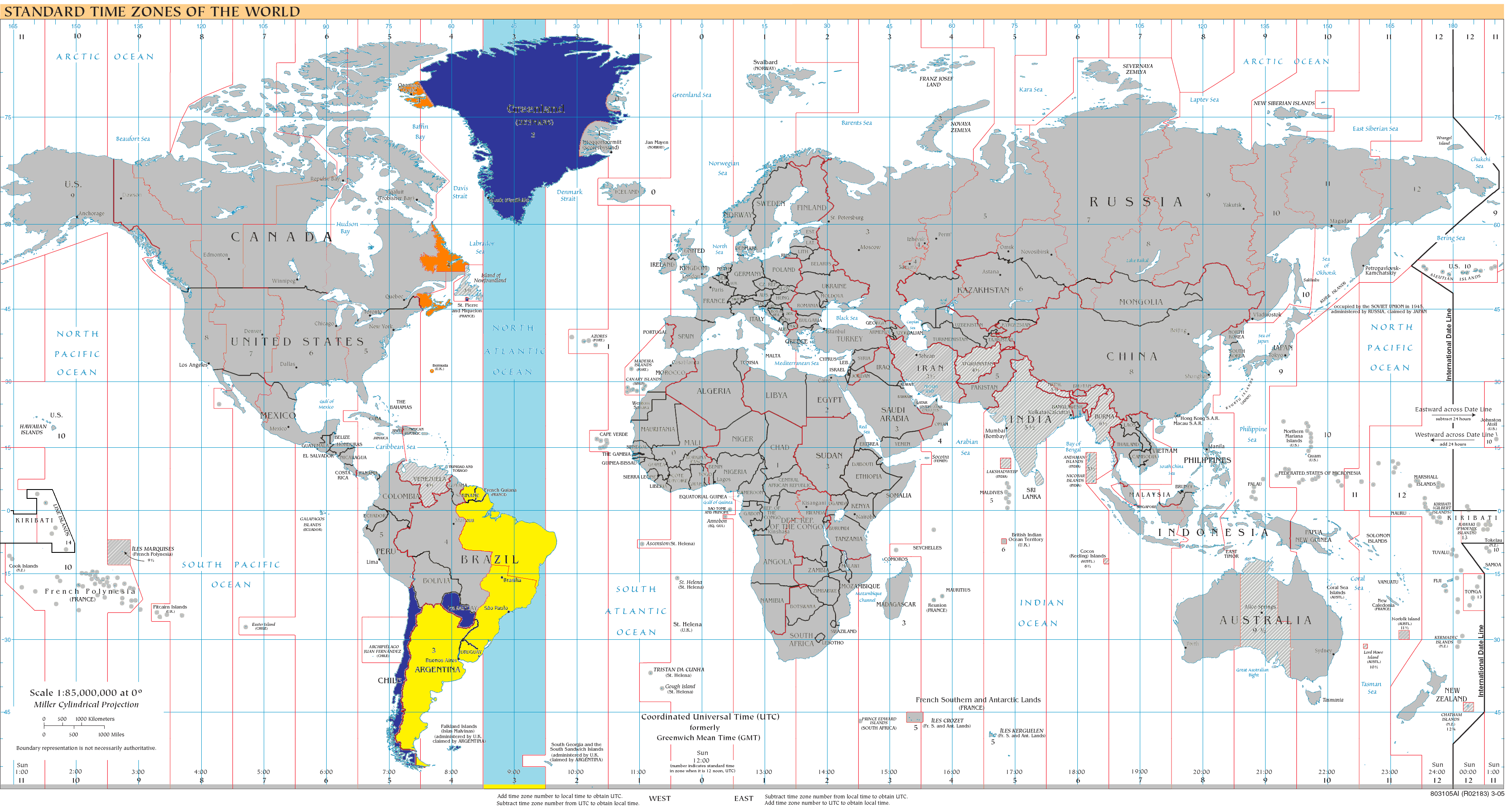
- World map with the time zone highlighted: Blue (January), orange (July), yellow (year-round) and light blue (sea areas)

UTC offset
- UTC: UTC−03:00

Current time
- 18:39, 19 March 2026 UTC−03:00 [refresh]

Central meridian
- 45 degrees W

Date-time group
- P

Time in Brazil, since 25 April 2019. Time in Brazil: ACT / Acre Time / UTC−5 / (BRT–2); AMT / Amazon Time / UTC−4 / (BRT−1); BRT / Brasília Time / UTC−3 / (BRT); FNT / Fernando de Noronha Time / UTC−2 / (BRT+1)

UTC−03:00 is an identifier for a time offset from UTC of −03:00.

== As standard time (Northern Hemisphere winter) ==
=== Atlantic Ocean ===
- France
  - Saint Pierre and Miquelon

== As daylight saving time (Northern Hemisphere summer) ==
Principal cities: Halifax, Saint John, Fredericton, Hamilton, Sydney

=== North America ===
- Canada – Atlantic Time Zone
  - New Brunswick
  - Newfoundland and Labrador
    - Labrador
      - Except the area between L'Anse-au-Clair and Norman's Bay
  - Nova Scotia
  - Prince Edward Island
- Denmark (see time in the Danish Realm)
  - Greenland, but with DST rules from the US
    - Pituffik Space Base
- United Kingdom
  - Bermuda

== As standard time (year-round) ==
Principal cities: Cayenne, São Paulo, Brasília, Rio de Janeiro, Porto Alegre, Belo Horizonte, Buenos Aires, Montevideo, Paramaribo, Stanley, Asunción

=== South America ===
- Argentina
- Brazil
  - Except the western states of Acre, Amazonas, Mato Grosso, Mato Grosso do Sul, Rondônia and Roraima; and offshore islands
- Chile
  - Magallanes/Antarctic
- France
  - French Guiana
- Paraguay
- Suriname
- United Kingdom
  - Falkland Islands
- Uruguay

=== Antarctica ===
==== Southern Ocean ====
- Some bases on the Antarctic Peninsula and nearby islands. See also Time in Antarctica
- Argentina
  - Argentine Antarctica
  - Carlini Base
  - San Martin Base
- United Kingdom
  - British Antarctic Territory
  - Rothera Research Station
- United States
  - Palmer Station

== As daylight saving time (Southern Hemisphere summer) ==
Principal cities: Santiago

=== South America ===
- Chile (except Easter Island and Magallanes/Antarctic)

=== Antarctica ===
- Some bases on the Antarctic Peninsula and nearby islands. See also Time in Antarctica

== Places using UTC−03:00, outside the 45°W ± 7.5° range ==
- El Chaltén, Argentina (72°53′W corresponding to UTC−04:51)
- Buenos Aires, Argentina (58°22′W corresponding to UTC−03:53:48)
- Stanley, Falkland Islands (57°51'W corresponding to UTC−03:51:24)
- Asunción, Paraguay (57°38'W corresponding to UTC-03:50:32)
- Uruguaiana, Brazil (57°05'W corresponding to UTC–03:48:20)
- Montevideo, Uruguay (56°23’W corresponding to UTC−03:44:51)
- Saint Pierre and Miquelon (56°12′W corresponding to UTC−03:44:40)
- Paramaribo, Suriname (55°10′W corresponding to UTC−03:40:40)
- Recife, Brazil (34°54′W corresponding to UTC−02:19:36)

== See also ==
- Time in Argentina
- Time in Brazil
- Time in Canada
- Time in Chile
- Time in Denmark
- Time in Paraguay
- Time in Uruguay
