= Time in the United States =

Major U.S. time zones
- (updated November 2007)
Current time
Guam	8:59 am, November 16, 2026 [refresh]
Atlantic	6:59 pm, November 15, 2026 [refresh]
Eastern	5:59 pm, November 15, 2026 [refresh]
Central	4:59 pm, November 15, 2026 [refresh]
Mountain	3:59 pm, November 15, 2026 [refresh] (Note: Time in Arizona (besides the Navajo Nation): 3:59 pm, November 15, 2026 [refresh])
Pacific	2:59 pm, November 15, 2026 [refresh]
Alaska	1:59 pm, November 15, 2026 [refresh]
Hawaii–Aleutian	12:59 pm, November 15, 2026 [refresh] (Note: Time in Hawaii: 12:59 pm, November 15, 2026 [refresh])
Samoa	11:59 am, November 15, 2026 [refresh]

In the United States, time is divided into nine standard time zones covering the states, territories and other US possessions, with most of the country observing daylight saving time (DST) for approximately the spring, summer, and fall months. The time zone boundaries and DST observance are regulated by the Department of Transportation, but no single official map of those existed until the agency announced intentions to make one in September 2022. Official and highly precise timekeeping services (clocks) are provided by two federal agencies: the National Institute of Standards and Technology (NIST) (an agency of the Department of Commerce); and the United States Naval Observatory (USNO). The clocks run by these services are kept synchronized with each other as well as with those of other international timekeeping organizations.

It is the combination of the time zone and daylight saving rules, along with the timekeeping services, which determines the legal civil time for any U.S. location at any moment.

== History ==
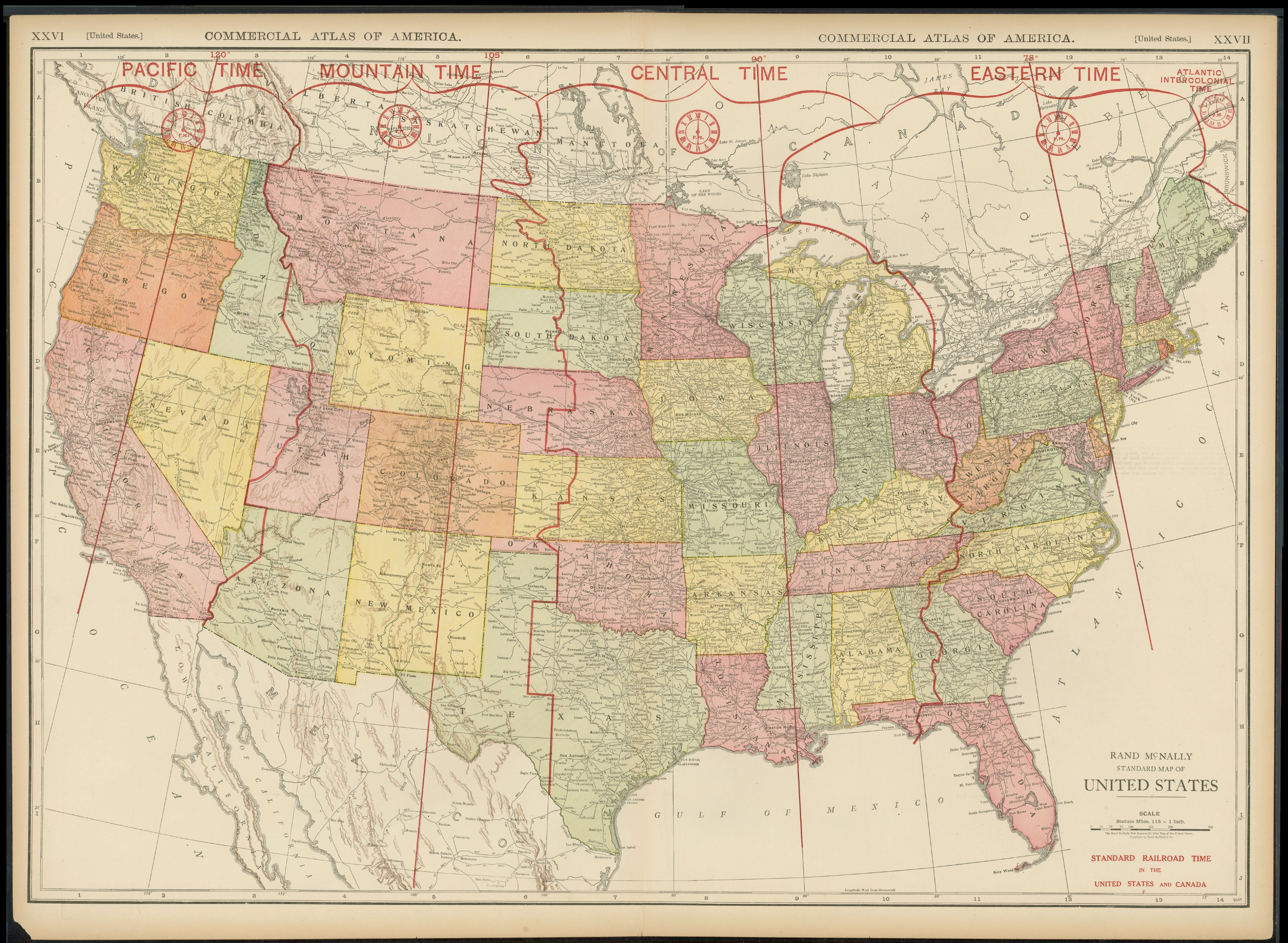
Rand McNally Standard Map of the United States, 1921, showing time zone boundaries different from today

Before the adoption of four standard time zones for the contiguous United States, many towns and cities set their clocks to noon when the sun passed their local meridian, pre-corrected for the equation of time on the date of observation, to form local mean solar time. Noon occurred at different times but time differences between distant locations were barely noticeable prior to the 19th century because of long travel times and the lack of long-distance instant communications prior to the development of the telegraph.

The use of local solar time became increasingly awkward as railways and telecommunications improved. American railroads maintained many different time zones during the late 19th century. Each train station set its own clock making it difficult to coordinate train schedules and confusing to passengers. Time calculation became a serious problem for people traveling by train (sometimes hundreds of miles in a day), according to the Library of Congress. Train drivers had to recalculate their own clocks in order to know departure time. Every city in the United States used a different time standard so there were more than 300 local sun times to choose from. Time zones were therefore a compromise, relaxing the complex geographic dependence while still allowing local time to be approximate with mean solar time. Railroad managers tried to address the problem by establishing 100 railroad time zones, but this was only a partial solution to the problem.

Weather service chief Cleveland Abbe introduced four standard time zones for his weather stations, an idea which he offered to the railroads. Operators of the new railroad lines needed a new time plan that would offer a uniform train schedule for departures and arrivals. Four standard time zones for the contiguous United States were introduced at noon on November 18, 1883, in Chicago, Illinois, when the telegraph lines transmitted time signals to all major cities.

In October 1884, the International Meridian Conference at Washington, D.C., decided that the prime meridian for longitude and timekeeping should be one that passes through the center of the transit instrument at the Greenwich Observatory in the United Kingdom. The conference therefore established the Greenwich Meridian as the prime meridian and Greenwich Mean Time (GMT) as the world's time standard. The U.S. time-zone system grew from this, in which all zones referred back to GMT on the prime meridian.

=== From GMT to UTC ===
In 1960, the International Radio Consultative Committee formalized the concept of Coordinated Universal Time (UTC), which became the new international civil time standard. UTC is, within about 1 second, mean solar time at 0°. UTC does not observe daylight saving time.

For most purposes, UTC is considered interchangeable with GMT, but GMT is no longer precisely defined by the scientific community. UTC is one of several closely related successors to GMT.

== United States and regional time zones ==
Standard time zones in the United States and other regions are currently defined at the federal level by statute 15 U.S.C. § 260. The federal law also establishes the transition dates and times at which daylight saving time occurs, with federal law making its observation dependent on state or tribal law. It is ultimately the authority of the secretary of transportation, in coordination with the states, to determine which regions will observe which of the standard time zones and if they will observe daylight saving time. As of August 9, 2007, the standard time zones are defined in terms of hourly offsets from UTC. Prior to this they were based upon the mean solar time at several meridians 15° apart west of Greenwich (GMT).

Only the full-time zone names listed below are official; abbreviations are by common use conventions, and duplicated elsewhere in the world for different time zones.

Standard time zones of the United States and its surrounding areas
Time zone	Standard	DST	Region
Atlantic	UTC−04:00	(not observed)	Puerto Rico, U.S. Virgin Islands
Eastern	UTC−05:00	UTC−04:00	Connecticut, Delaware, Georgia, Maine, Maryland, Massachusetts, New Hampshire, New Jersey, New York, North Carolina, Ohio, Pennsylvania, Rhode Island, South Carolina, Vermont, Virginia, Washington, D.C., West Virginia; Partially: Florida, Indiana, Kentucky, Michigan, Tennessee
Eastern	UTC−05:00	(not observed)	No DST observed, not defined by 15 U.S.C. §260: Navassa Island, Bajo Nuevo Bank, Serranilla Bank
Central	UTC−06:00	UTC−05:00	Alabama, Arkansas, Illinois, Iowa, Louisiana, Minnesota, Mississippi, Missouri, Oklahoma, Wisconsin; Partially: Florida, Indiana, Kansas, Kentucky, Michigan, Nebraska, North Dakota, South Dakota, Tennessee, Texas
Mountain	UTC−07:00	UTC−06:00	Colorado, Montana, New Mexico, Utah, Wyoming; Partially: Idaho, Kansas, Nebraska, Nevada, North Dakota, Oregon, South Dakota, Texas
Mountain	UTC−07:00	(not observed)	Arizona (no DST outside of Navajo Nation)
Pacific	UTC−08:00	UTC−07:00	California, Washington; Partially: Idaho, Nevada, Oregon
Alaska	UTC−09:00	UTC−08:00	Partially: Alaska
Hawaii–Aleutian	UTC−10:00	UTC−09:00	Partially: Alaska
Hawaii–Aleutian	UTC−10:00	(not observed)	Hawaii, Not defined by 15 U.S.C. §260: Johnston Atoll (no DST observed in Hawaii and Johnston Atoll)
American Samoa	UTC−11:00	(not observed)	American Samoa; Not defined by 15 U.S.C. §260: Jarvis Island, Midway Atoll, Palmyra Atoll, Kingman Reef
—	UTC−12:00	(not observed)	Not defined by 15 U.S.C. §260: Baker Island, Howland Island
—	UTC+12:00	(not observed)	Not defined by 15 U.S.C. §260: Wake Island
Chamorro	UTC+10:00	(not observed)	Guam, Northern Mariana Islands

=== Zones used in the contiguous U.S. ===
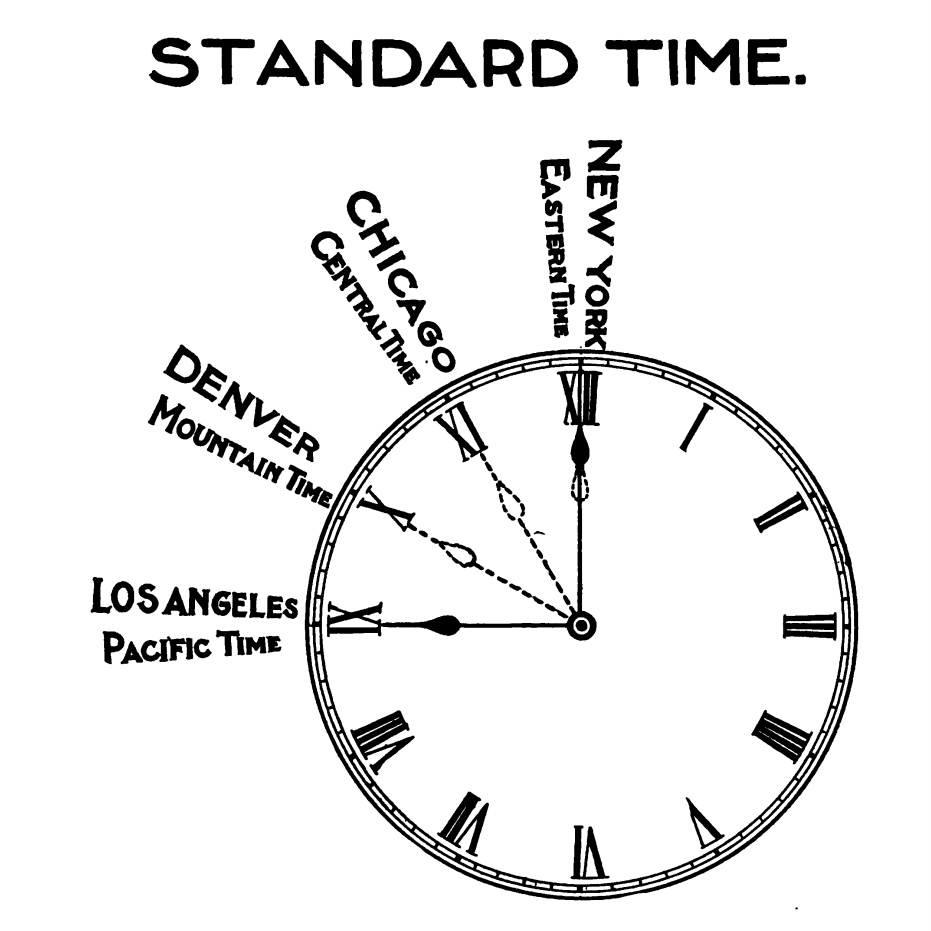
Standard time in the contiguous United States, illustration 1903

From east to west, the four time zones of the contiguous United States are:

- Eastern Time Zone (Zone R), which comprises roughly the states on the Atlantic coast and the eastern two thirds of the Ohio Valley.
- Central Time Zone (Zone S), which comprises roughly the Gulf Coast, Mississippi Valley, and most of the Great Plains.
- Mountain Time Zone (Zone T), which comprises roughly the states and portions of states that include the Rocky Mountains and the western quarter of the Great Plains.
- Pacific Time Zone (Zone U), which comprises roughly the states on the Pacific coast, plus Nevada and the Idaho Panhandle.

=== Zones used in states beyond the contiguous U.S. ===
- Alaska Time Zone (UTC−09:00; Zone V), which comprises most of the state of Alaska.
- Hawaii–Aleutian Time Zone (no daylight saving in Hawaii, UTC−10:00; zone W), which includes Hawaii and most of the length of the Aleutian Islands chain (west of 169°30′W).

=== Zones used in U.S. territories ===
- Samoa Time Zone (UTC−11:00; Zone X), which comprises American Samoa.
- Chamorro Time Zone (UTC+10:00; Zone K), which comprises Guam and the Northern Mariana Islands.
- Atlantic Time Zone (UTC−04:00; Zone Q), which comprises Puerto Rico and the U.S. Virgin Islands.

=== Minor Outlying Islands ===
Some United States Minor Outlying Islands are outside the time zones defined by 15 U.S.C. §260 and exist in waters defined by nautical time. In practice, military crews may simply use Zulu time (UTC+00:00) when on these islands. Baker Island and Howland Island are in UTC−12:00, while Wake Island is in UTC+12:00. Because they exist on opposite sides of the International Date Line, it can, for example, be noon Thursday on Baker and Howland islands while simultaneously being noon Friday on Wake Island. Other outlying islands include Jarvis Island, Midway Atoll, Palmyra Atoll, and Kingman Reef (UTC−11:00); Johnston Atoll (UTC−10:00); and Navassa Island, Bajo Nuevo Bank, and Serranilla Bank (UTC−05:00).

=== Antarctic research stations ===
In Antarctica, the U.S. research facility Palmer Station is in UTC−03:00, while McMurdo Station and Amundsen–Scott South Pole Station use UTC+12:00 in order to coordinate with their main supply base in New Zealand.

== Boundaries between the zones ==
(Described from north to south along each boundary.)

=== Eastern–Central boundary ===
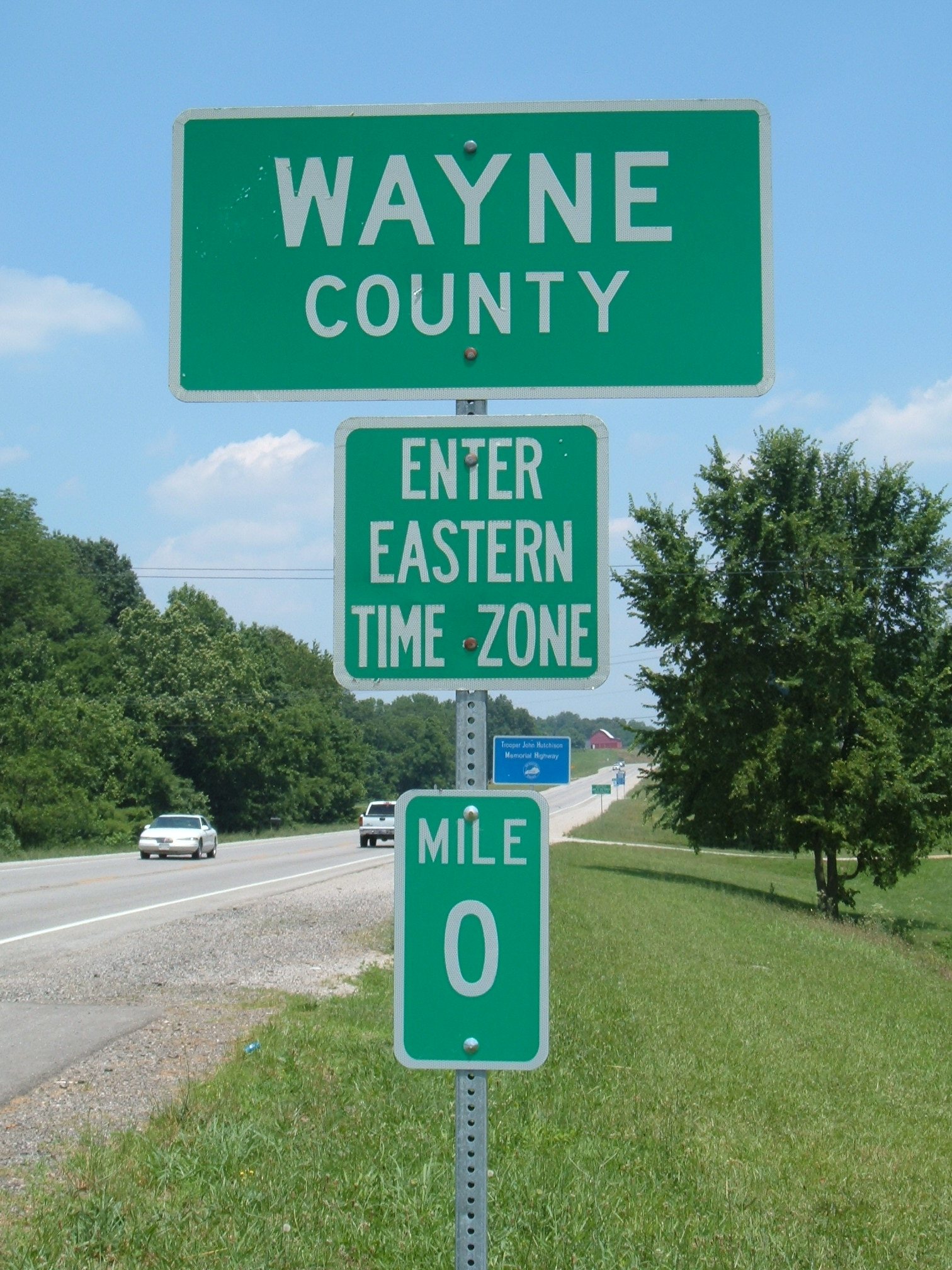
Marker showing the border of Wayne County, Kentucky, and the Eastern Time Zone, coming from Clinton County, same state, Central Time Zone

Time in Indiana: red counties belong to the Central Time Zone.

- roughly follows the border between Wisconsin (to the south and west) and the Upper Peninsula of Michigan (to the north and east); the Upper Peninsula (U.P.) counties that border Wisconsin (namely Gogebic, Iron, Dickinson, and Menominee counties) observe central time, all other counties in the U.P. observe eastern time
- follows Lake Michigan
- divides a small portion of Northwestern Indiana near Chicago from the rest of the state
- follows the border between Central Illinois (west) and Central Indiana (east), with parts of the central time zone extending into northern and southern Indiana.
- divides a small portion of Southwestern Indiana from the rest of the state
- divides Kentucky in half roughly along a line that is west of Louisville running from northwest to southeast.
- divides the region legally defined as East Tennessee, except for four counties adjoining Middle Tennessee, from the rest of Tennessee.
- follows the border between Alabama (west) and Georgia (east), although Phenix City and some nearby towns unofficially observe eastern time.
- divides the Florida Panhandle along the Apalachicola River and Intracoastal Waterway just west of Tallahassee.

=== Central–Mountain boundary ===
- divides the southwest portion of North Dakota from the rest of the state
- divides South Dakota roughly in half
- divides the western third of Nebraska from the rest of the state
- divides a very small portion of extreme western Kansas bordering Colorado (Greeley, Hamilton, Sherman, and Wallace counties) from the rest of the state (three other counties which border Colorado—Cheyenne, Morton, and Stanton counties—observe central time)
- follows the border between New Mexico (west) and Oklahoma (east) (although the zone legally begins at the Oklahoma–New Mexico state line, Kenton in extreme northwestern Cimarron County, Oklahoma unofficially observes mountain time)
- follows the border between New Mexico (west) and Texas (east)
- divides El Paso, Hudspeth, and a portion of northwestern Culberson counties that includes eastern Guadalupe Mountains National Park from the rest of Texas

=== Mountain–Pacific boundary ===
- follows the border between northern Idaho (to the west) and northwestern Montana (to the east)
- turns west at 45°33.46′N 114°33.89′W (just south of Nez Perce Pass), and follows the Idaho county line to the Salmon River
- follows the Salmon River west to the town of Riggins, where the Salmon River turns north. This puts almost all of northern Idaho in the Pacific time zone, except for the small loop described next.
- turns north and follows the Salmon River to the Snake River at the Oregon state line (at 45°51.3′N 116°47.5′W). This loop to the north creates a curious situation where one can enter a more westerly time zone by traveling east over one of the six bridges across this portion of the Salmon River.
- turns south and follows the Snake River between Oregon (west) and Idaho (east) to the northern border of Malheur County, Oregon
- turns west and follows the northern border of Malheur County to its western border, where it turns south
- follows the western border of Malheur County to latitude 42.45° (42°27′ N), where it turns east, and returns to the Oregon/Idaho state line
- turns south and follows the border between Oregon (west) and Idaho (east)
- turns east and follows the border between Idaho (north) and Nevada (south) along the 42nd parallel north to longitude 114.041726 W.
- turns south and follows the border between Nevada (west) and Utah (east), except for following the west city limit line of West Wendover dividing it from the rest of Nevada, and putting it in the mountain time zone. Jackpot, just south of the 42nd parallel and some 25 miles (40 km) west of the time zone south turn, also observes mountain time, on an unofficial basis.
- follows the border between Nevada (west) and Arizona (east)
- follows the border between California (west) and Arizona (east), mostly defined by the Colorado River, to the border between the U.S. and Mexico.

== Daylight saving time (DST) ==
Daylight saving time (DST) begins on the second Sunday of March and ends on the first Sunday of November.

Clocks are set ahead one hour at 2:00 a.m. on the following start dates and set back one hour at 2:00 a.m. on the corresponding end dates:

Dates for daylight saving time
Year	Start	End
2026	March 8	November 1
2027	March 14	November 7
2028	March 12	November 5
2029	March 11	November 4
2030	March 10	November 3
2031	March 9	November 2
2032	March 14	November 7
2033	March 13	November 6
2034	March 12	November 5
2035	March 11	November 4

In response to the Uniform Time Act of 1966, each state has officially chosen to apply one of two rules over its entire territory:

- Most use the standard time for their zone (or zones, where a state is divided between two zones), except for using daylight saving time during the summer months. Originally this ran from the first Sunday in April until the last Sunday in October. Two subsequent amendments, in 1986 and 2005, have shifted these days so that daylight saving time now runs from the second Sunday in March until the first Sunday in November.
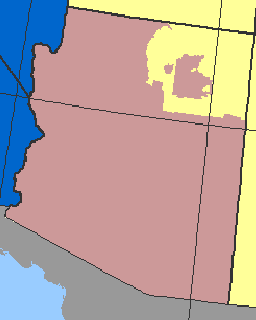
  Arizona time: Year-round Mountain Standard Time (red) and DST (yellow)
- Arizona and Hawaii use standard time throughout the year. However:
  - The Navajo Nation observes DST throughout its entire territory, including the portion that lies in Arizona. But the Hopi Nation, which is entirely surrounded by the Navajo Nation and is entirely in Arizona, does not observe DST. (See map inset right.)
- In 2005, Indiana passed legislation that took effect on April 2, 2006, that placed the entire state on daylight saving time (see Time in Indiana). Before then, Indiana officially used standard time year-round, with the following exceptions:
  - The portions of Indiana that were on Central Time observed daylight saving time.
  - Some Indiana counties near Cincinnati and Louisville were on Eastern Time but did (unofficially) observe DST.

The Energy Policy Act of 2005 extended daylight saving time for an additional month beginning in 2007.

The Sunshine Protection Act of 2021 passed the United States Senate in March 2022. The bill would make daylight saving time the time year-round in the entire United States. The bill was not voted on by the House of Representatives.

Previous DST change dates
Year	Start	End
2000	Apr 2	Oct 29
2001	Apr 1	Oct 28
2002	Apr 7	Oct 27
2003	Apr 6	Oct 26
2004	Apr 4	Oct 31
2005	Apr 3	Oct 30
2006	Apr 2	Oct 29
2007	Mar 11	Nov 4
2008	Mar 9	Nov 2
2009	Mar 8	Nov 1
2010	Mar 14	Nov 7
2011	Mar 13	Nov 6
2012	Mar 11	Nov 4
2013	Mar 10	Nov 3
2014	Mar 9	Nov 2
2015	Mar 8	Nov 1
2016	Mar 13	Nov 6
2017	Mar 12	Nov 5
2018	Mar 11	Nov 4
2019	Mar 10	Nov 3
2020	Mar 8	Nov 1
2021	Mar 14	Nov 7
2022	Mar 13	Nov 6
2023	Mar 12	Nov 5
2024	Mar 10	Nov 3
2025	Mar 9	Nov 2
2026	Mar 8	Nov 1

== See also ==
- Date and time notation in the United States
- Daylight saving time in the United States
- Time in Canada
- Effects of time on North American broadcasting
- History of time in the United States
- List of time zones by U.S. state
- Lists of time zones
- Permanent time observation in the United States
- Speaking clock § United States
