= Time in Abkhazia =

- Time zone
- Time zone map of the region: the blue area with the star in the northwest of Georgia is Abkhazia, coloured to represent that it is on Moscow time (UTC+3), rather than Georgia Time (UTC+4).

UTC offset
- MSK: UTC+03:00

Current time
- :: MSK [refresh]

Observance of DST
- DST is not observed in this time zone.

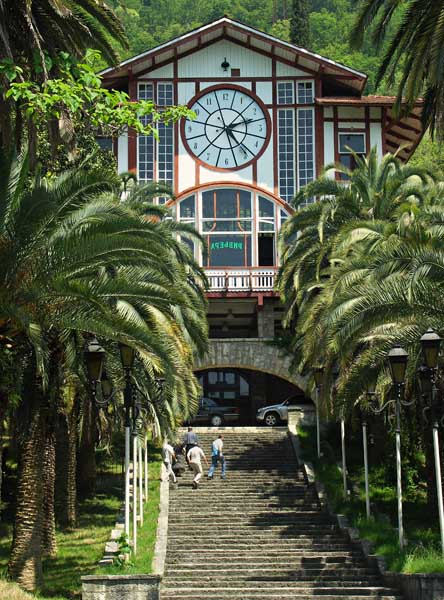
Clock at the Gagripsh restaurant in Gagra, Abkhazia.

Time in Abkhazia, a partially recognised state largely recognised by most countries as part of Georgia, is given by Moscow Standard Time (MST; UTC+03:00). Abkhazia does not observe daylight saving time.

As Abkhazia is not an internationally recognised sovereign state, it is not granted a zone.tab entry on the IANA time zone database.

== See also ==
- Time in Europe
- Time in South Ossetia
- List of time zones by country
- List of time zones by UTC offset
