= Time in Nebraska =

Time zones in North America

All counties in the Nebraska Panhandle, as well as the counties listed below, are within the Mountain Time Zone:

- Arthur
- Chase
- Dundy
- Grant
- Hooker
- Keith
- Perkins

Western Cherry County, up to the boundaries of Crookston, Valentine, Cleveland, and Loup precincts, is contained within the Mountain Time Zone. East of this boundary, the county is within the Central Time Zone.

Aside from the areas listed above, the rest of Nebraska is within the Central Time Zone.

== IANA time zone database ==
The 2 zones for Nebraska as given by zone.tab of the IANA time zone database. Columns marked * are from the zone.tab.

c.c.*	coordinates*	TZ*	comments*	UTC offset	UTC offset DST	Map
US	+415100−0873900	America/Chicago	Central (most areas)	−06:00	−05:00	
US	+394421−1045903	America/Denver	Mountain (most areas)	−07:00	−06:00	

== See also ==
- Time in the United States
