= Time in Nevada =

Almost all of Nevada is in the Pacific Time Zone (UTC -8). The few exceptions that exist all observe Mountain Time (UTC -7) and are close to the borders of Idaho or Utah. Nevada is the only non-coastal state to observe Pacific Time in the majority of its territory; most of Idaho uses Mountain Time, and Arizona uses Mountain Time as well, though the latter often coincides with Pacific Time due to the majority of the state not observing daylight saving time.

Mountain Time is officially observed close to the border to Utah in:

- West Wendover, making Elko County, Nevada one of the few counties in the US that is split between two time zones.

Mountain Time is also unofficially observed in the following Idaho border areas:

- Jackpot for the convenience of tourists from Idaho
- Owyhee and the rest of the Duck Valley Indian Reservation
- Mountain City because of its proximity to Owyhee
- Jarbidge due to its proximity to Owyhee

== IANA time zone database ==
The zones for Nevada as given by zone.tab of the IANA time zone database, columns marked * are from the zone.tab:

c.c.*	coordinates*	TZ*	comments*	UTC offset	UTC offset DST	Note
US	+340308−1181434	America/Los_Angeles	Pacific	−08:00	−07:00	
US	+433649−1161209	America/Boise	Mountain – ID (south), OR (east)	−07:00	−06:00	

== See also ==
- Time in the United States
