= Time in Texas =

Time zones of Texas, United States

Texas is divided into two time zones, with most of state observing Central Time. The state's westernmost areas, El Paso County, Hudspeth, and northwestern Culberson County (including Guadalupe Mountains National Park) observe Mountain Time. The entire state observes daylight saving time.

== IANA time zone database ==
The 2 zones for Texas as given by zone.tab of the IANA time zone database. Columns marked * are from the zone.tab.

c.c.*	coordinates*	TZ*	comments*	UTC offset	UTC offset DST	Map
US	+415100−0873900	America/Chicago	Central (most areas)	−06:00	−05:00	
US	+394421−1045903	America/Denver	Mountain (most areas)	−07:00	−06:00	

== Historical ==
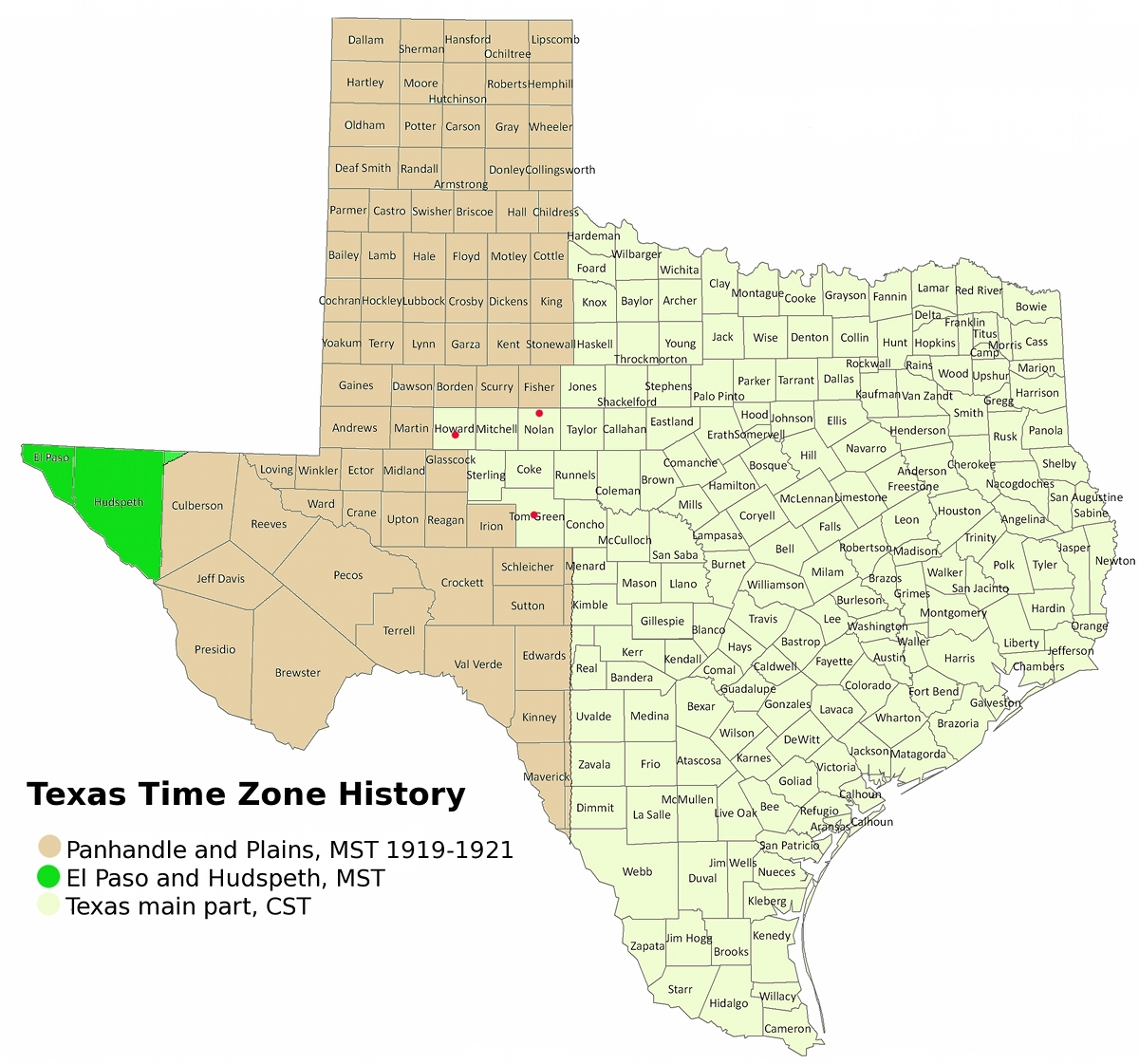
Historical Texas time zones. Now only the green area follows Mountain Time, the rest follows Central Time.

The "Panhandle and Plains" section of Texas is now in the Central Time Zone, but had a two-year period of being in the Mountain Time Zone between 1919 and 1921.

== See also ==
- Time in the United States
