= UTC+12:45 =

Time zone

- Time zone
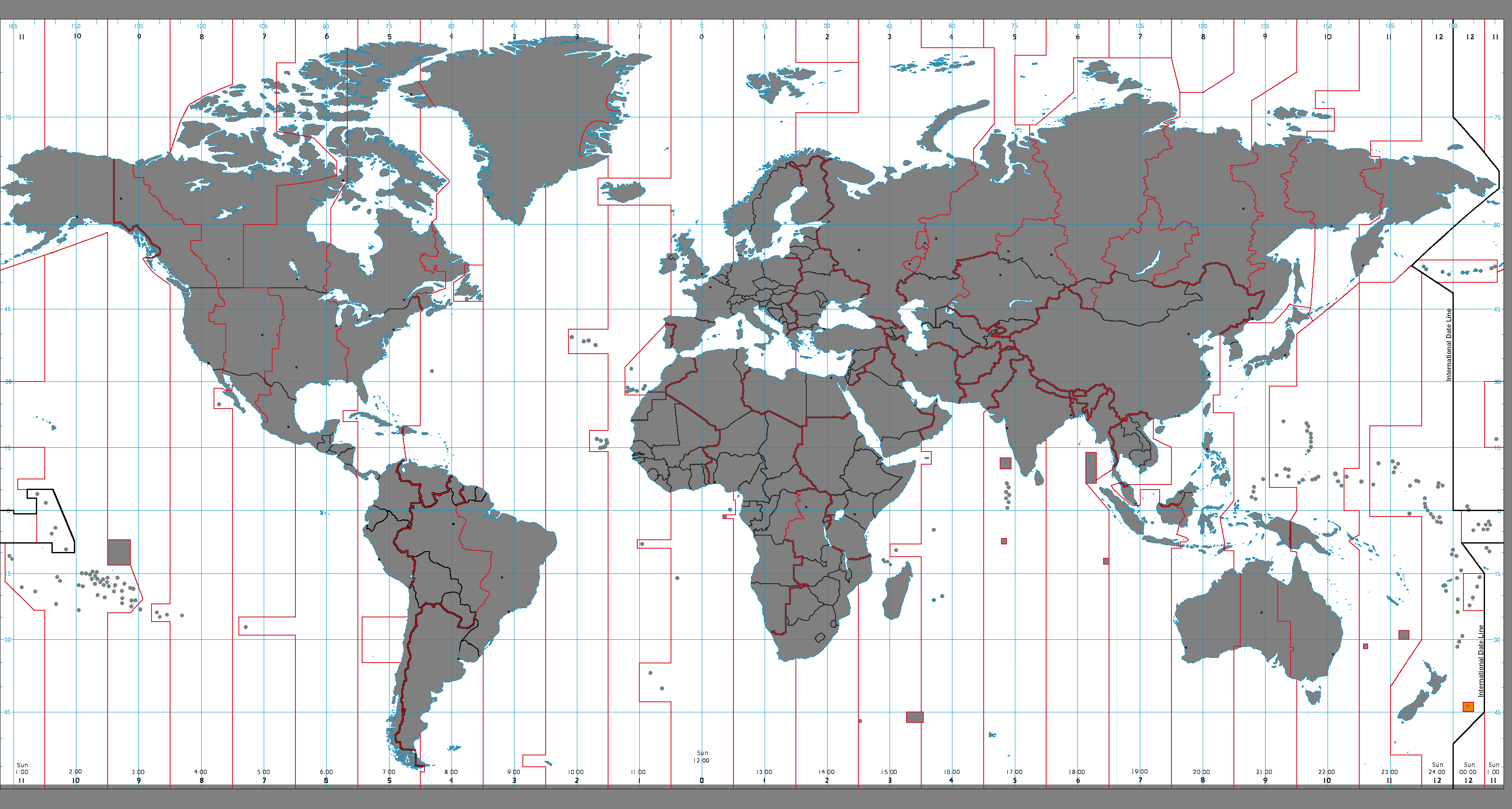
- World map with the time zone highlighted

UTC offset
- UTC: UTC+12:45

Current time
- :: UTC+12:45 [refresh]

Central meridian
- 168.75 degrees W

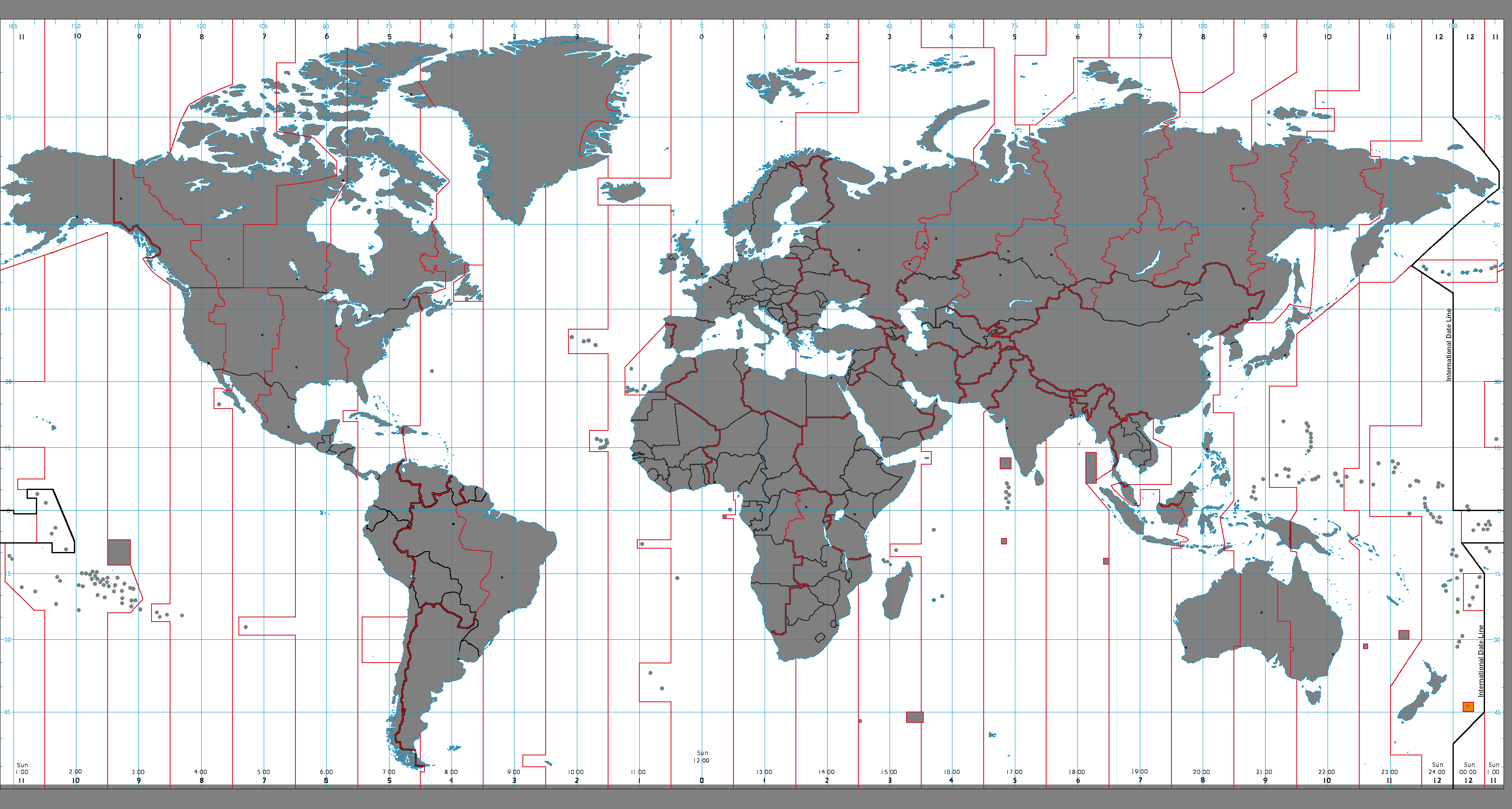
UTC+12:45: blue (December), orange (June), yellow (year-round), light blue (sea areas)

UTC+12:45 is an identifier for a time offset from UTC of +12:45.

== As standard time (Southern Hemisphere winter) ==
Principal settlement: Waitangi

=== Oceania ===
- New Zealand – Chatham Standard Time
  - Chatham Islands
  - Pitt Island
  - South East Island
  - The Fort
  - Little Mangere Island
  - Star Keys
  - The Sisters
  - Forty-Fours

== See also ==
- Time in New Zealand
