= Time in Kansas =

Zoning of the U.S. state for standard time

Time in Kansas is divided into two time zones. The Central Time Zone contains 101 of the state's 105 counties. The four counties Sherman, Wallace, Greeley, and Hamilton, all of which border Colorado fall into the Mountain Time Zone. (Until 1990, the western half of Kearny County, including the county seat of Lakin, was also on Mountain Time.)

Cheyenne County borders Colorado and Nebraska, but is in the Central Time Zone, creating an unusual situation where one can cross into the Mountain Time Zone from three of the county's four sides. The exception is Rawlins County, which borders Cheyenne County to the east.

== IANA time zone database ==
The 2 zones for Kansas as given by zone.tab of the IANA time zone database. Columns marked * are from the zone.tab.

c.c.*	coordinates*	TZ*	comments*	UTC offset	UTC offset DST	Map
US	+415100−0873900	America/Chicago	Central (most areas)	−06:00	−05:00	
US	+394421−1045903	America/Denver	Mountain (most areas)	−07:00	−06:00	

== See also ==
- Time in the United States
