= Time in Tennessee =

Time zones in North America

Time in Tennessee, as in all U.S. states, is regulated by the United States Department of Transportation.

65 of the 95 counties in the state of Tennessee, comprising about 73 percent of its total area, lie in the Central Time Zone. This encompasses the entirety of the western and middle grand divisions plus three counties in East Tennessee, while the remaining 30 counties lie in the Eastern Time Zone.

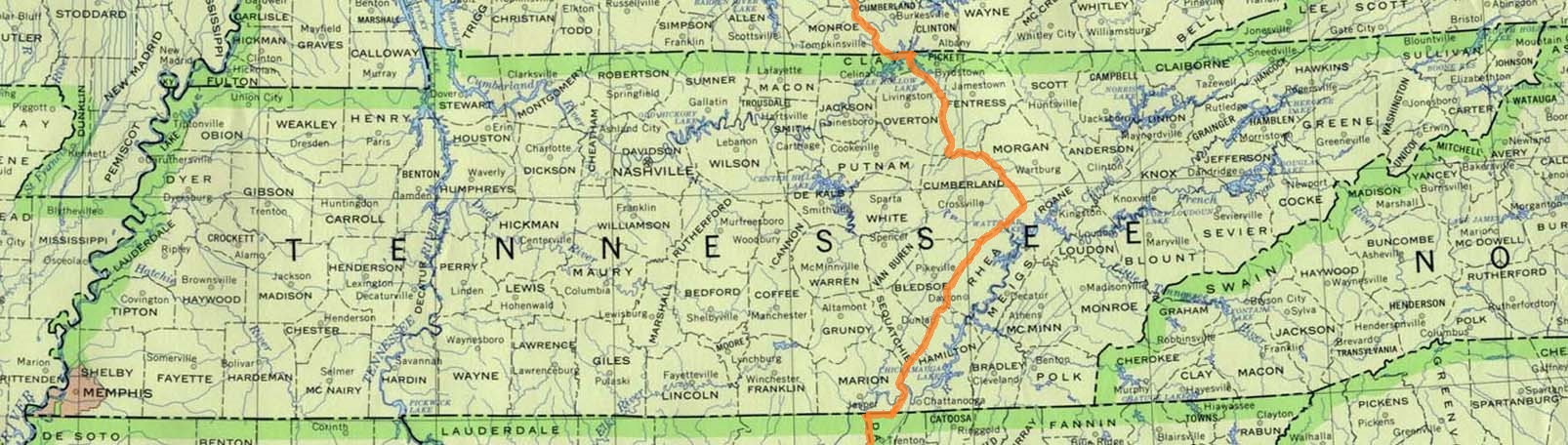
Map of time zones in Tennessee

All counties observe Daylight Saving Time.

== Time zone boundary areas ==
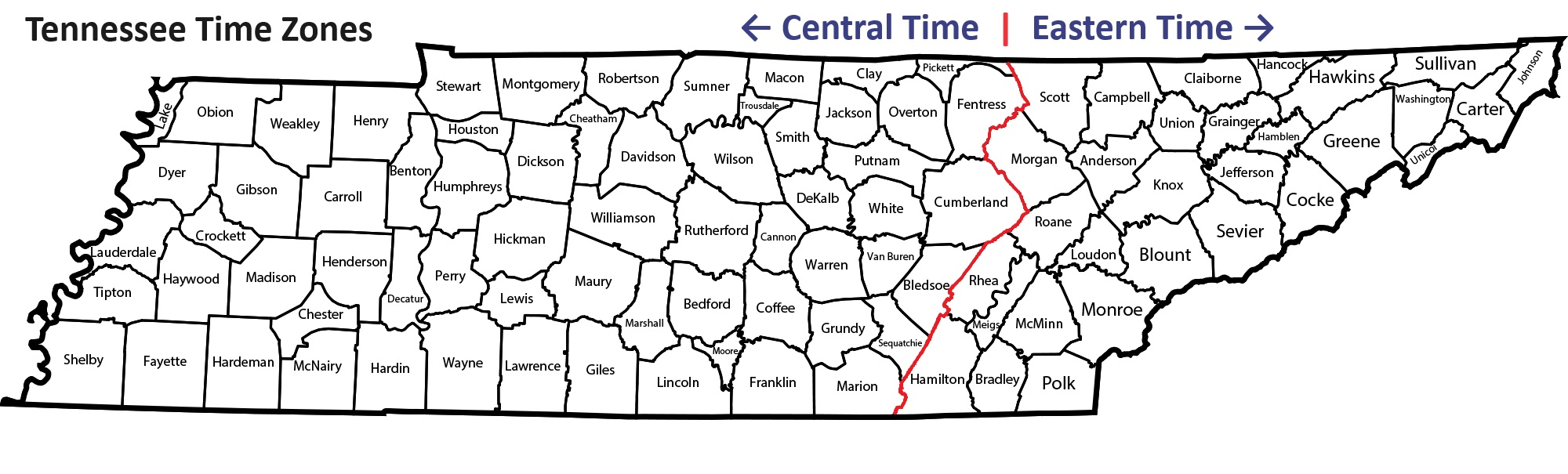
Map of time zones following county lines in Tennessee

=== Central boundary counties ===
- Bledsoe (East)
- Cumberland (East)
- Fentress (Middle)
- Marion (East)
- Sequatchie (Middle)
- Pickett (Middle)

=== Eastern boundary counties ===
- Hamilton
- Morgan
- Rhea
- Roane
- Scott

== IANA time zone database ==
The IANA time zone database identifier for Tennessee is America/New_York for the Eastern Time Zone portion and America/Chicago for the Central Time Zone portion.

== See also ==
- Time in the United States
- List of counties in Tennessee
