= Time in Nunavut =

Time zones in North America

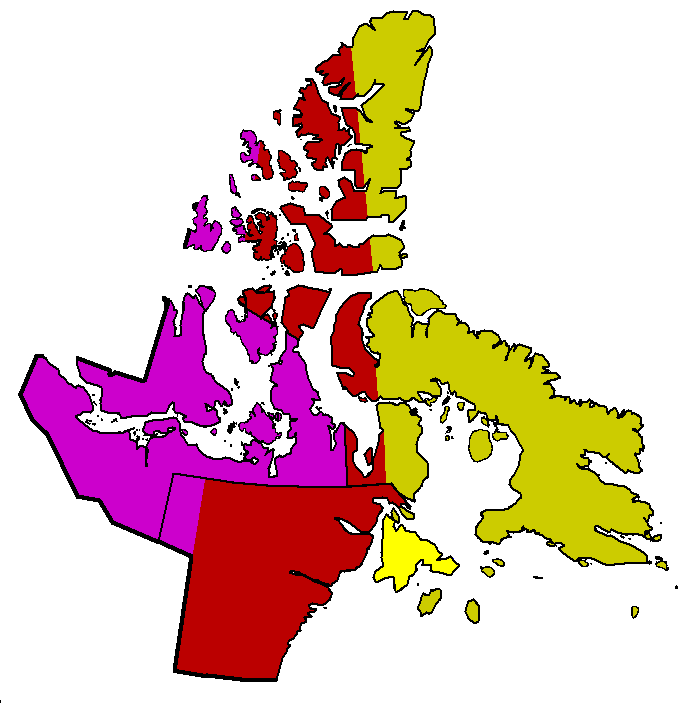
Time in Nunavut: Standard / DST; GMT−05:00 / GMT−04:00 / Eastern Time; GMT−05:00 (year round) / / Eastern Time; GMT−06:00 / GMT−05:00 / Central Time; GMT−07:00 / GMT−06:00 / Mountain Time

Nunavut is divided into three time zones: Eastern, Central and Mountain.

Mountain Time

- Mountain Time Zone: Mountain Standard Time (MST: UTC−07:00) and Mountain Daylight Time (MDT: UTC−6:00)
  - All communities in the Kitikmeot Region
  - Portions of the Kivalliq Region west of 102° West

Central Time

- Central Time Zone: Central Standard Time (CST: UTC−06:00) and Central Daylight Time (CDT: UTC−05:00)
  - Portions of Kivalliq and Qikiqtaaluk Regions between 85° West and 102° West, including Resolute, Naujaat, Baker Lake, and the west shore of Hudson Bay, excluding all of Southampton Island.

Eastern Time

- Eastern Time Zone: Eastern Standard Time (EST: UTC−05:00) and Eastern Daylight Time (EDT: UTC−04:00)
  - Portions of Kivalliq and Qikiqtaaluk Region east of 85° West, including Sanikiluaq, Cape Dorset, Sanirajak, Igloolik, Arctic Bay, Grise Fiord, and Iqaluit)
  - All of Southampton Island follows EST year round (i.e. does not observe daylight saving time)

== History ==
When the territory was created in 1999, its new government believed a unified time zone would make it easier for its citizens to conduct business. Public hearings noted there was support for this idea, although disagreement as to which time zone to observe. The territorial government announced that effective October 31, 1999, all clocks would change to Central Standard Time. Iqaluit, the capital located in the far eastern edge of the Eastern time zone, was unhappy with this decision. The city council voted against the measure and vowed to keep the city on Eastern time. In October 1999, the city council backed down and agreed to accept the change to Central time "in the spirit of working with the Nunavut government". They agreed to review the decision in six months.

After hearing complaints from a number of communities in late 1999 and early 2000, the government modified the time zones. They announced that daylight saving time would no longer be observed, and the territory would now be on Eastern Standard Time year round. The change would be effective October 29, 2000.

Many western communities (supplied from the south by provincial communities on Mountain time) felt this put them too much out of synchronisation with their neighbours. After some debate it was decided the far western communities would be allowed to change back to Central time on November 4, 2000; however, they would observe daylight saving time in the summer. This would unify Nunavut with one time in the summer and keep western communities a constant one-hour difference from their southern neighbours. On November 6, 2000, the territorial government announced that Kugluktuk and Cambridge Bay would be the only two communities that would continue to change their clocks twice a year.

In April 2001, Nunavut reverted to the three previous time zones it inherited from the Northwest Territories administration of the region, thus meaning its time zones had changed four times in a 17-month period. The only community to keep its clocks on standard time year-round (without adjusting twice a year for daylight saving time) was Coral Harbour on Southampton Island, which had not observed DST, even going back well before the creation of Nunavut.

In 2007, most of the United States and Canada increased the number of weeks each year when daylight saving time would be in effect. Those areas of Nunavut that observed daylight saving time followed suit. Whereas previously DST ran from the first Sunday of April to the last Sunday of October, beginning in 2007 it ran from the second Sunday in March to the first Sunday in November.

In 2026, several jurisdictions in Canada, including neighbouring Manitoba and Northwest Territories, adopted permanent DST. This prompted Nunavut to explore making similar changes to align with these regions.
