= Time in Kentucky =

Central Time Zone Eastern Time Zone

About 60% of Kentucky lies in the Eastern Time Zone, with the rest in the Central Time Zone, as follows:

Central boundary counties

- Breckinridge
- Grayson
- Hart
- Green
- Adair
- Russell
- Clinton

Eastern boundary counties

- Meade
- Hardin
- LaRue
- Taylor
- Casey
- Pulaski
- Wayne

Counties to the north and east of this boundary are in the Eastern Time Zone, while counties to the south and west are in the Central Time Zone. 30% of the area in Eastern Time Zone is further west than areas to the south. This progression to the west is further continued into Indiana.

== IANA time zone database ==
In the IANA time zone database, Kentucky is covered by four time zones, columns marked " * " contain the data from the file zone.tab:

CC *	Coordinates *	TZ *	Comments *	UTC offset	UTC offset DST	Note	Map
US	+404251−0740023	America/New_York	Eastern (most areas)	−05:00	−04:00		
US	+415100−0873900	America/Chicago	Central (most areas)	−06:00	−05:00		
US	+381515−0854534	America/Kentucky/Louisville	Eastern – KY (Louisville area)	−05:00	−04:00	Observed Central Time before July 23, 1961	
US	+364947−0845057	America/Kentucky/Monticello	Eastern – KY (Wayne)	−05:00	−04:00	Observed Central Time before October 29, 2000	

== Notable clocks ==
- The Floral Clock in Frankfort is a working clock that has a face planted with flowers, and is an attraction in its own right.
- The Colgate Clock in Clarksville, Indiana, is the second-largest timepiece in the world. It faces the Ohio River to its south, and is most typically viewed from across the river in Louisville.
- Louisville formerly featured a notable clock known as the Louisville Clock or the Derby Clock, which was 40-foot (12 m) high and decorated with mechanized sculptures. It was first installed in 1976 and after several relocations and various mechanical problems, was dismantled in 2015.

== See also ==
- Time in the United States
