= Time in South Ossetia =

- Time zone
- Time zone map of the region: the blue area with the star in the north of Georgia is South Ossetia, coloured to represent that it is on Moscow time (UTC+3), rather than Georgia Time (UTC+4).

UTC offset
- MSK: UTC+03:00

Current time
- :: MSK [refresh]

Observance of DST
- DST is not observed in this time zone.

Time in South Ossetia, which claims independence but is widely recognized as being part of Georgia, is given by Moscow Standard Time (MSK; UTC+03:00). South Ossetia does not currently observe daylight saving time.

== History ==
South Ossetia switched from Georgia Standard Time to Moscow Standard Time on 26 October 2014.
