= Time in Gibraltar =

Time in Europe: Light Blue / Western European Time / Greenwich Mean Time (UTC); Blue / Western European Time / Greenwich Mean Time (UTC); Blue / Western European Summer Time / British Summer Time / Irish Standard Time (UTC+1); Red / Central European Time (UTC+1); Red / Central European Summer Time (UTC+2); Yellow / Eastern European Time / Kaliningrad Time (UTC+2); Ochre / Eastern European Time (UTC+2); Ochre / Eastern European Summer Time (UTC+3); Green / Moscow Time / Turkey Time (UTC+3); Turquoise / Armenia Time / Azerbaijan Time / Georgia Time / Samara Time (UTC+4); ▉▉▉▉ Pale colours: Standard time observed all year ▉▉▉ Dark colours: Summer time observed

Gibraltar uses Standard Time or Central European Time (UTC+01:00) and daylight saving time or Central European Summer Time (UTC+02:00).

== Prior to 1982 ==
Until 1982, Gibraltar used GMT+1 all year round. This put it in neighbouring Spain's time zone / Central European Time for 5 months and in the UK's zone for the 7 months of British Summer Time. In 1982, Gibraltar changed to use Central European Time all year round, putting it wholly in tune with Central Europe.

== IANA time zone database ==
The IANA time zone database contains one time zone for Gibraltar in the file zone.tab, named Europe/Gibraltar.

This refers to the area having the ISO 3166-1 alpha-2 country code "GI".

== See also ==
- List of time zones
