= Time in the United States Virgin Islands =

The United States Virgin Islands use the Atlantic Time Zone with no daylight saving time, due to how close it is to the equator. This is also true in Puerto Rico.
