= Time in Idaho =

Time zones in North America

Pacific Time Zone Mountain Time Zone Split between both time zones

The U.S. state of Idaho is covered by two time zones, as described below. All locations observe daylight saving time.

The Pacific Time Zone (UTC−08:00, DST UTC−07:00) covers an area roughly coterminous with the Idaho Panhandle or North Idaho:

- Benewah
- Bonner
- Boundary
- Clearwater
- Kootenai (includes Coeur d'Alene)
- Latah (includes Moscow)
- Lewis
- Nez Perce (includes Lewiston)
- Shoshone
- Portion of Idaho County north of the Salmon River
- The towns of Burgdorf and Warren

An easy way to distinguish the line is that it essentially follows the line that divides Washington and Oregon. Idaho counties east of Washington observe Pacific Time, and Idaho counties east of Oregon observe Mountain Time.

The Mountain Time Zone (UTC−07:00, DST UTC−06:00) covers the rest of the state.

== History ==
The 1918 Standard Time Act put most of Idaho into the Pacific Time Zone – only the very eastern parts were in the Mountain Time Zone.

For three decades or so in the middle of the twentieth century, Shoshone County had its own time arrangements; it was said to be "on permanent daylight time", so that in the winter the county had the same clock time as Montana and southern Idaho, but in the summer it had the same clock time as Washington and northern Idaho.

== tz database ==
The tz database version 2026b contains two time zones for Idaho:

CC	Coordinates	TZ	Comments	UTC offset	UTC offset DST	Notes
US	+340308−1181434	America/Los_Angeles	Pacific	−08:00	−07:00	
US	+433649−1161209	America/Boise	Mountain – ID (south), OR (east)	−07:00	−06:00	
