= Time in North Dakota =

Entire county observing Mountain Time County split between Mountain Time and Central Time Entire county observing Central Time

A majority of North Dakota counties are located in the Central Time Zone, with 8 counties in the southwest, all west of the Missouri River, following Mountain Time.

The counties which observe MST are as follows:

- Adams
- Billings
- Bowman
- Golden Valley
- Grant
- Hettinger
- Slope
- Stark
- Parts of Dunn, McKenzie, and Sioux

In 2019, a bill was proposed in the North Dakota House of Representatives to put the entire state on Central Time, but failed.

== IANA time zone database ==
In the IANA time zone database, North Dakota is covered by five time zones to reflect changes in the border between the Central and Mountain time zones since 1970. Each of the five areas has had the same time within since January 1, 1970.

On October 25, 1992 Oliver County moved from Mountain Time to Central Time. The IANA time zone database entry is named for the county seat and largest city Center.

On October 26, 2003 all of Morton County moved to Central Time. Prior to this, the western part of the county had used Mountain Time. The database entry is named for New Salem, as the county seat Mandan was already using Central Time.

On November 7, 2010 Mercer County was moved from Mountain Time to Central Time. The database entry is named for the county's largest city, Beulah. It remains the most recent time zone adjustment in the United States.

Columns marked "*" contain the data from the file zone.tab:

c.c.*	coordinates*	TZ*	comments*	UTC offset	UTC offset DST	Note	Map
US	+415100−0873900	America/Chicago	Central (most areas)	−06:00	−05:00	most of the state	
US	+394421−1045903	America/Denver	Mountain (most areas)	−07:00	−06:00	southwestern North Dakota	
US	+471551−1014640	America/North_Dakota/Beulah	Central – ND (Mercer)	−06:00	−05:00	Mercer County	
US	+470659−1011757	America/North_Dakota/Center	Central – ND (Oliver)	−06:00	−05:00	Oliver County	
US	+465042−1012439	America/North_Dakota/New_Salem	Central – ND (Morton rural)	−06:00	−05:00	western Morton County	

== See also ==
- Time in South Dakota
