= Time in South Dakota =

Time zones in North America

South Dakota lies in both the Mountain Time Zone and the Central Time Zone. Central Time consists of the eastern half of the state, and contains both its largest city, Sioux Falls, and its capital, Pierre. Mountain Time consists of the western half of the state, with the largest city in this zone being Rapid City.

Despite officially being on Mountain Time, Fort Pierre informally observes Central Time due to its interconnectivity with Pierre.

== IANA time zone database ==
The 2 zones for South Dakota as given by zone.tab of the IANA time zone database. Columns marked * are from the zone.tab.

c.c.*	coordinates*	TZ*	comments*	UTC offset	UTC offset DST	Map
US	+415100−0873900	America/Chicago	Central (most areas)	−06:00	−05:00	
US	+394421−1045903	America/Denver	Mountain (most areas)	−07:00	−06:00	

== See also ==
- Time in North Dakota
