= Time in Oregon =

Time zones in North America

Most of Oregon lies in the Pacific Time Zone (shown in blue), except for the northern part of Malheur County (shown in purple), which is in the Mountain Time Zone.

Time in Oregon is divided into two zones, with the vast majority in the Pacific Time Zone. Most of sparsely populated Malheur County, including its largest city, Ontario, and its county seat, Vale, are in the Mountain Time Zone due to their proximity to Boise, Idaho. The time zone division occurs at the southwest corner of township 35 S, range 37 E (approximately 42.597 degrees north latitude), continuing east to the state line, then south along the Oregon–Idaho border to the Nevada state line.

In 2019, the Oregon Senate passed a bill that would put the state (except Malheur County) on year-round daylight saving time, effectively moving Oregon full time to Mountain Standard Time (UTC−7). The bill has not yet been considered by the Oregon House of Representatives. Similar proposals have been approved in Washington and California; all would need approval of the U.S. Congress.

== IANA time zone database ==
In the IANA time zone database, Oregon is contained in two zones:

c.c.*	coordinates*	TZ*	comments*	UTC offset	UTC offset DST	Note
US	+340308−1181434	America/Los_Angeles	Pacific	−08:00	−07:00	All except northern 4/5 of Malheur County
US	+433649−1161209	America/Boise	Mountain – ID (south), OR (east)	−07:00	−06:00	Northern 4/5 of Malheur County only
