= Time in Michigan =

Map of Michigan time zones. Counties in dark red follow Central Time while counties in yellow follow Eastern Time.

Michigan observes Eastern Time, except for four counties in the Upper Peninsula on the border with Wisconsin, which observe Central Time.

== History ==
Before time zones were introduced, every place used local observation of the sun to set their clocks, which means they used local mean time, every city different based on their longitude. Detroit used 05:32:11 west of Greenwich and Menominee 05:50:27 west of Greenwich.

Time zones were introduced in the United States in 1883. They were introduced in different years based on local decisions. Michigan adopted Central Standard Time throughout the state effective September 18, 1885. In 1915, Detroit changed to Eastern time to be on the same time zone as New York, followed by most of the rest of the state in 1931.

In 1967, when the Uniform Time Act came into effect, the Upper Peninsula went under year-round CST, with no daylight saving time. In 1973, the majority of the peninsula switched to Eastern Time; only the four western counties of Gogebic, Iron, Dickinson, and Menominee continue to observe Central Time.

== IANA time zone database ==
The zone for Michigan as given by zone.tab of the IANA time zone database

c.c.	coordinates	TZ	comments	UTC offset	UTC offset DST	Note
US	+421953−0830245	America/Detroit	Eastern – MI (most areas)	−05:00	−04:00	
US	+450628−0873651	America/Menominee	Central – MI (Wisconsin border)	−06:00	−05:00	Was used statewide from January 1, 1905, until May 15, 1915. This was prior to the advent of DST, so UTC-6 was used all year long.

== Gallery ==
A road sign indicating the entrance to a county with Central Time observed

A road sign indicating the entrance to a county with Eastern Time observed

== See also ==
- Time in the United States
