= Time in Alabama =

Time zone in North America

All of the U.S. state of Alabama is in the Central Time Zone (UTC−06:00, DST UTC−05:00) and observes daylight saving time.

Unofficially, Phenix City in Russell County and an area surrounding it, Lanett and Valley in Chambers County and some towns in Lee County observe Eastern Time (UTC−05:00, DST UTC−04:00). In the case of Lannett and Valley, the exception was originally due to the local West Point Pepperell textile mills having headquarters in West Point, Georgia, in the Eastern Time Zone.

== IANA time zone database ==
The IANA time zone database identifier for Alabama is America/Chicago.
