= Time in Florida =

Time zones of Florida, United States

Map of Florida time zones. Counties in red follow central time. Counties in yellow follow eastern time. Counties with a checkerboard pattern have areas that follow both time zones.

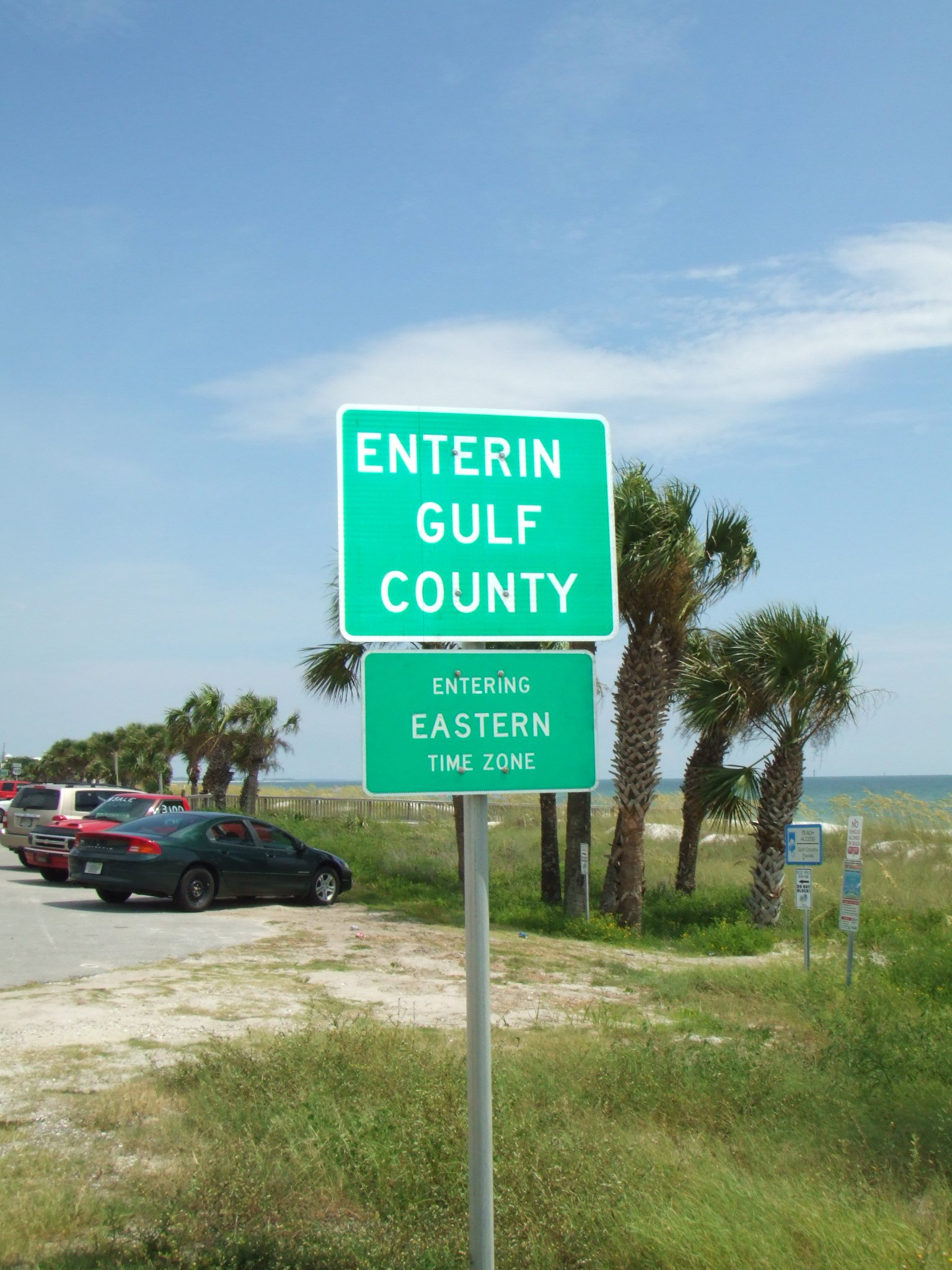
Enterin Gulf County / Entering Eastern Time Zone

Florida is divided into two time zones, with most of state in the Eastern Time Zone. Parts of the Florida panhandle in northwest Florida lies in the Central Time Zone. The entire state observes daylight saving time.

The areas that observe Central Time include:

- Bay, 2010 population 168,852
- Calhoun, 2010 population 14,625
- Escambia, 2010 population 297,619
- Holmes, 2010 population 19,927
- Jackson, 2010 population 49,746
- Okaloosa 2010 population 180,822
- Santa Rosa, 2010 population 151,372
- Walton, 2010 population 55,043
- Washington, 2010 population 24,935
- Northern part of Gulf County

The 2010 population of all counties that are entirely in the Central Time Zone was 995,882 out of a total state population of 18,801,310 at that time, or 5.3% of the total state population.

== Proposed shift to Daylight Saving Time year-round (Sunshine Protection Act) ==
In 2018, the Florida Legislature approved, and the governor signed, the "Sunshine Protection Act" (House Bill 1013), which would permanently move Florida to Daylight Saving Time. A related bill, Senate Bill 858, also proposed unifying the time zones of the Panhandle counties to the rest of the state, moving the ten counties that are within the Central Time Zone to the Eastern Time Zone, but this bill was not passed. A change to year-round Daylight Saving Time would require approval from the United States Department of Transportation as well as the United States Congress.

== tz database ==
The tz database version 2026f contains two time zones for Florida.

CC	Coordinates	TZ	Comments	UTC offset	UTC offset DST	Notes
US	+415100−0873900	America/Chicago	Central (most areas)	−06:00	−05:00	
US	+404251−0740023	America/New_York	Eastern (most areas)	−05:00	−04:00	
