= UTC−07:00 =

Time zone

- Time zone
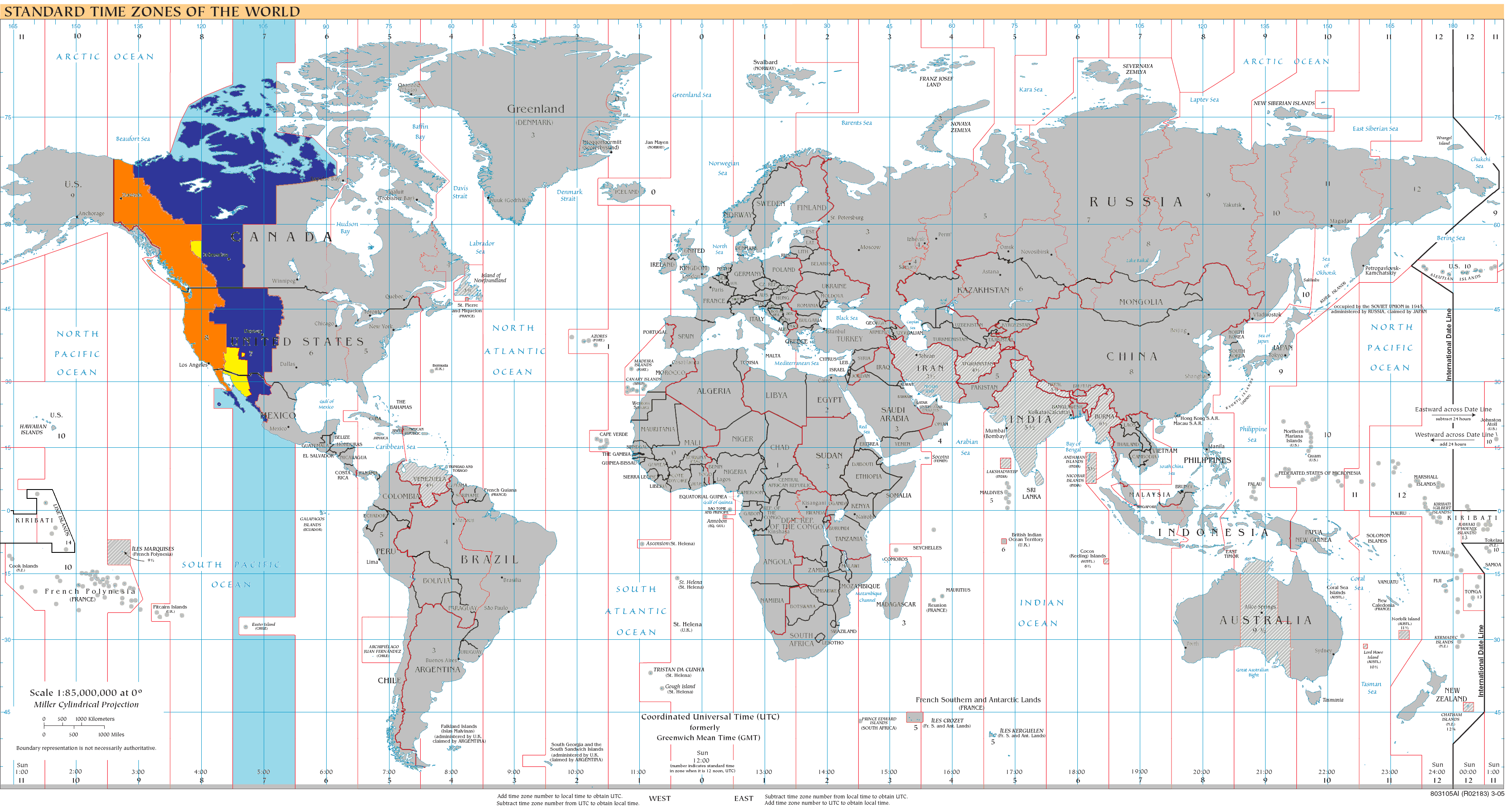
- World map with the time zone highlighted

UTC offset
- UTC: UTC−07:00

Current time
- :: UTC−07:00 [refresh]

Central meridian
- 105 degrees W

Date-time group
- T

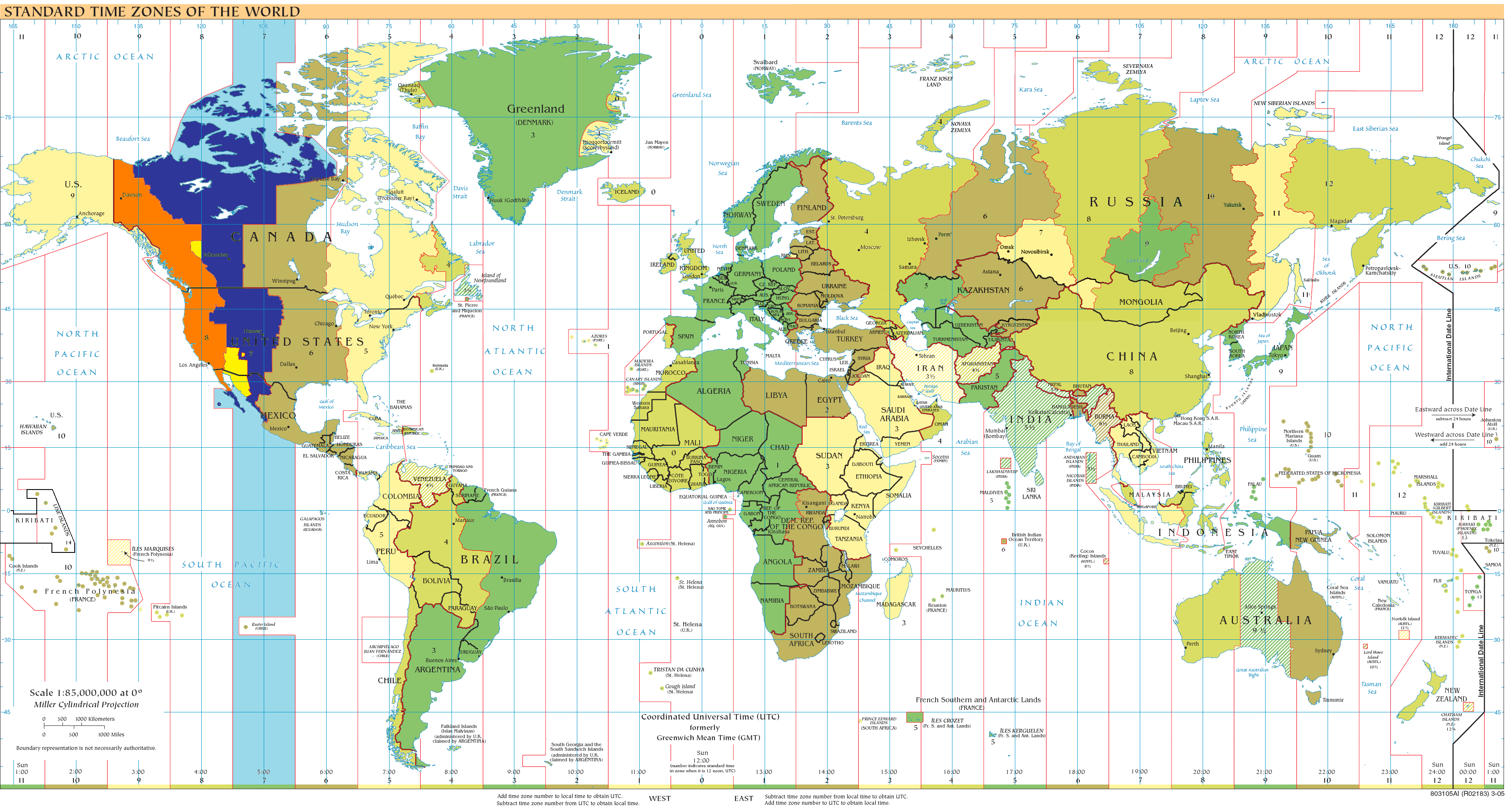
UTC−07:00: blue (January), orange (July), yellow (year-round), light blue (sea areas)

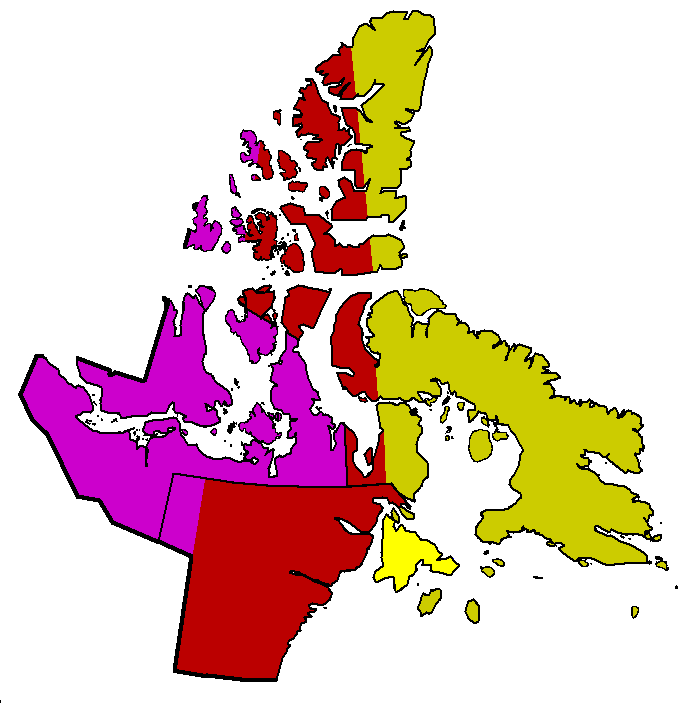
Time in Nunavut: Standard / DST; GMT−05:00 / GMT−04:00 / Eastern Time; GMT−05:00 (year round) / / Eastern Time; GMT−06:00 / GMT−05:00 / Central Time; GMT−07:00 / GMT−06:00 / Mountain Time

Time in Mexico: Mexican time zone / Standard / DST / U.S. equivalent; Zona Sureste / UTC−05:00 / / Eastern Standard Time; Zona Centro / UTC−06:00 / UTC−05:00 / Central Time; Zona Centro / UTC−06:00 / / Central Standard Time; Zona Pacífico / UTC−07:00 / UTC−06:00 / Mountain Time; Zona Pacífico / UTC−07:00 / / Mountain Standard Time; Zona Noroeste / UTC−08:00 / UTC−07:00 / Pacific Time

UTC−07:00 is an identifier for a time offset from UTC of −07:00. In North America, it is observed in the Mountain Time Zone (French: Heure des Rocheuses) during standard time and in the Pacific Time Zone during the other eight months (see daylight saving time). Some locations use it year-round.

== As standard time (Northern Hemisphere winter) ==
Principal cities: Denver, Salt Lake City, Ciudad Juárez

=== North America ===
- Canada (Mountain Time Zone)
  - Nunavut
    - Kitikmeot Region
- Mexico (near US border with New Mexico & western Texas)
  - Chihuahua
    - Municipalities of Janos, Ascensión, Juárez, Práxedis G. Guerrero and Guadalupe
- United States (Mountain Time Zone)
  - Arizona – Navajo Nation only (most of Arizona uses MST year-round)
  - Colorado
  - Idaho
    - South of Salmon River
  - Kansas
    - Western counties of Greeley, Hamilton, Sherman and Wallace
  - Montana
  - Nebraska
    - Western counties of Cherry (western part), Hooker, Arthur, Keith, Perkins, Chase and Dundy, and all counties to the west of these
  - Nevada
    - West Wendover
  - New Mexico
  - North Dakota
    - Southwestern counties of Adams, Billings, Bowman, Dunn (southern part), Golden Valley, Grant, Hettinger, McKenzie (southern part), Sioux (west of ND route 31), Slope and Stark
  - Oklahoma
    - Kenton
  - Oregon
    - Malheur County (except a small strip in the south)
  - South Dakota
    - Western counties of Corson, Dewey, Stanley (western part), Jackson and Bennett, and all counties to the west of these
  - Texas
    - Western counties of Culberson (northwestern part), El Paso and Hudspeth
  - Utah
  - Wyoming

== As daylight saving time (Northern Hemisphere summer) ==
Principal cities: Los Angeles, Tijuana

=== North America ===
- Mexico
  - Baja California
- United States (Pacific Time Zone)
  - California
  - Idaho
    - North of Salmon River
  - Nevada (except West Wendover)
  - Oregon
    - All of the state except Malheur County (but including a small strip in the south of Malheur)
  - Washington

== As standard time (year-round) ==
Principal cities: Phoenix, Hermosillo, Vancouver

=== North America ===
- Canada (Yukon Time)
  - Yukon
- Canada (Pacific Time)
  - British Columbia (except the Regional District of East Kootenay, Golden, and Columbia-Shuswap Regional District Area A)
- Mexico (Zona Pacifico)
  - Baja California Sur
  - Nayarit (except the municipality of Bahía de Banderas)
  - Sinaloa
  - Sonora
- United States (Mountain Time Zone)
  - Arizona (except the Navajo Nation)
