= Daylight saving time by country =

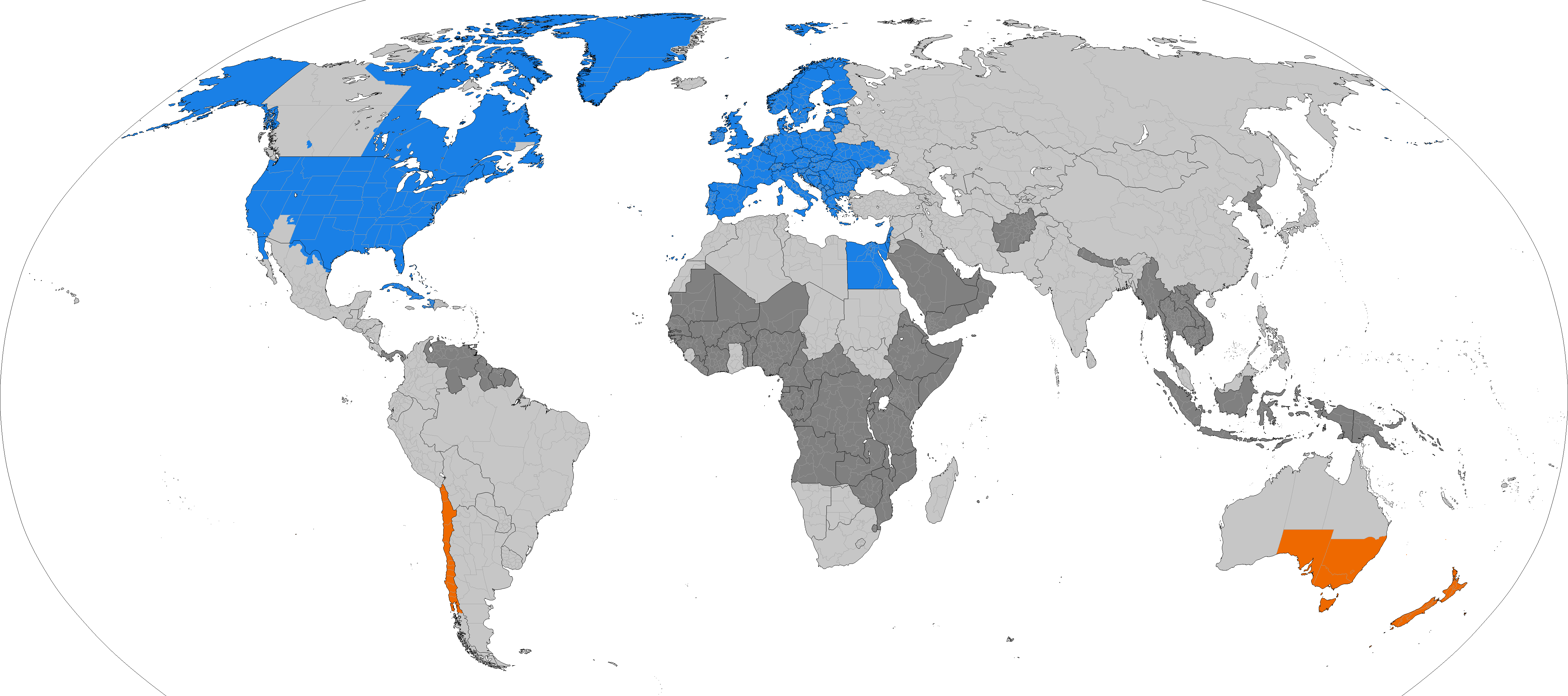
Daylight saving time (DST) by country Observes DST around the Northern Hemisphere summer Observes DST around the Southern Hemisphere summer Formerly observed DST Never observed DST

Daylight saving time (DST), also known as summer time, is the practice of advancing clocks during part of the year, typically by one hour around spring and summer, so that daylight ends at a later time of the day. As of 2026, DST is observed in most of Europe, most of North America and parts of Africa and Asia around the Northern Hemisphere summer, and in parts of South America and Oceania around the Southern Hemisphere summer. It was also formerly observed in other areas.

== Scheduled observance ==
Daylight saving time in the world. Areas shown in the same color start and end DST within less than a week of each other.

As of 2026, the following locations were scheduled to start and end DST at the following times:

Locations	DST start	DST end	Shift
Bahamas; Bermuda; Canada: Atlantic provinces, most of Nunavut (except Southampton Island), Ontario (east of 90°W) and Quebec (except Le Golfe-du-Saint-Laurent); Greenland: Pituffik Space Base; Haiti; Mexico: Baja California, and municipalities near the U.S. border except in Sonora; Saint Pierre and Miquelon; Turks and Caicos Islands; United States, except Arizona (without Navajo Nation), Hawaii and U.S. territories	Second Sunday in March at 02:00	First Sunday in November at 02:00	1 hour
Cuba	Second Sunday in March at 00:00 (Note: DST observed continuously from 8 March 2026 to 7 November 2027. No time changes in November 2026 or March 2027.)	First Sunday in November at 01:00	1 hour
European Union, except Overseas France (Note: Member states of the European Union (EU): Austria; Belgium; Bulgaria; Croatia; Cyprus; Czech Republic; Denmark (Note: The Faroe Islands and Greenland are not part of the EU and are listed separately.); Estonia; Finland (Note: Including Åland.); France (Note: Some parts of Overseas France are part of the EU but do not observe DST.); Germany; Greece; Hungary; Ireland; Italy; Latvia; Lithuania; Luxembourg; Malta; Netherlands (Note: Only the European part of the Netherlands is part of the EU and observes DST.); Poland; Portugal (Note: Including Azores and Madeira.); Romania; Slovakia; Slovenia; Spain (Note: Including the Canary Islands, Ceuta, Melilla and plazas de soberanía.); Sweden); Akrotiri and Dhekelia; Albania; Andorra; Bosnia and Herzegovina; Faroe Islands; Gibraltar; Greenland, except Pituffik Space Base and east coast of National Park; Guernsey; Isle of Man; Jersey; Kosovo; Liechtenstein; Moldova; Monaco; Montenegro; North Macedonia; Northern Cyprus; Norway; San Marino; Serbia; Switzerland; Transnistria; Ukraine, except occupied territories; United Kingdom; Vatican City	Last Sunday in March at 01:00 UTC	Last Sunday in October at 01:00 UTC	1 hour
Lebanon	Last Sunday in March at 00:00	Last Sunday in October at 00:00	1 hour
Israel	Friday before last Sunday in March at 02:00	Last Sunday in October at 02:00	1 hour
Palestine	Saturday before last Sunday in March at 02:00	Saturday before last Sunday in October at 02:00	1 hour
Egypt	Last Friday in April at 00:00	Last Thursday in October at 24:00	1 hour
Chile, except Aysén and Magallanes regions	First Saturday in September at 24:00 UTC−04:00 (Note: The time changes occur at Saturday 24:00 Continental Chile Time (UTC−04:00 standard time, UTC−03:00 DST) simultaneously in all parts of the country that observe DST. Accordingly, in Continental Chile except Aysén and Magallanes regions, and in Juan Fernández Islands and Desventuradas Islands, when DST starts, the local time changes from Saturday 24:00 (Sunday 00:00) to Sunday 01:00, and when DST ends, from Saturday 24:00 to 23:00; in Easter Island and Salas y Gómez Island (UTC−06:00 standard time, UTC−05:00 DST), when DST starts, the local time changes from Saturday 22:00 to 23:00, and when DST ends, from Saturday 22:00 to 21:00.)	First Saturday in April at 24:00 UTC−03:00	1 hour
Australia: Australian Capital Territory, Jervis Bay Territory, New South Wales (except Lord Howe Island), Norfolk Island, South Australia, Tasmania and Victoria	First Sunday in October at 02:00	First Sunday in April at 03:00	1 hour
Australia: Lord Howe Island	First Sunday in October at 02:00	First Sunday in April at 02:00	30 minutes
New Zealand	Last Sunday in September at 02:00 UTC+12:00 (Note: The time changes occur at 02:00 New Zealand Standard Time (UTC+12:00) simultaneously in all parts of the country that observe DST. Accordingly, in the regions of New Zealand, when DST starts, the local time changes from 02:00 to 03:00, and when DST ends, from 03:00 to 02:00; in the Chatham Islands (UTC+12:45 standard time, UTC+13:45 DST), when DST starts, the local time changes from 02:45 to 03:45, and when DST ends, from 03:45 to 02:45.)	First Sunday in April at 03:00 UTC+13:00	1 hour

In the table above, the DST start and end times refer to the local time before each change occurs, unless otherwise specified. The shift is the amount of time added at the DST start time and subtracted at the DST end time. For example, in the parts of Canada and the United States that observe DST, when DST starts, the local time changes from 02:00 to 03:00, and when DST ends, the local time changes from 02:00 to 01:00. As the time change depends on the time zone, it does not occur simultaneously in all parts of these countries. Conversely, in the parts of Europe that observe DST, the time change occurs simultaneously at 01:00 UTC regardless of their time zone.

== Historical observance ==
Location	Last year of time changes (Note: The year is listed only for areas that no longer observe DST.)	Notes
Akrotiri and Dhekelia		Observed DST since 1939.
Albania		Observed DST in 1940–1943, and since 1974.
Algeria	1981	Observed DST in 1916–1921, in the autumn of 1939, in 1944–1945, 1971, 1977–1978, and 1980–1981.
Andorra		Observed DST since 1985.
Argentina	2009	Observed DST in 1930–1969, 1974, 1988–2000, and 2007–2009.
Armenia	2011	Observed DST in 1981–1995, 1997–2011.
Australia		Main article: Daylight saving time in Australia DST used in Tasmania since 1967, in the Australian Capital Territory, Jervis Bay Territory, New South Wales, South Australia, and Victoria since 1971, and in Norfolk Island since 2019. Previously used nationwide in 1917 and 1942–1944, in Queensland in 1971–1972 and 1989–1992, and in Western Australia in 1974–1975, 1983–1984, 1991–1992, and 2006–2009.
Austria		Observed DST in 1916–1918, 1920, 1940–1948 (as part of Germany between 1940 and 1945) and since 1980.
Azerbaijan	2015	Observed DST in 1981–1992 and 1996–2015.
Bahamas		Observed DST since 1964.
Bangladesh	2009	Observed DST during World War II from 1942 to 1945 as part of the British Raj. Also observed in 2009.
Barbados	1980	Observed DST from 1977 to 1980.
Basutoland	1944	Observed DST in 1943–1944.
Bechuanaland	1944	Observed DST in 1943–1944.
Belarus	2010	Observed DST in 1941–1944, 1981–2010.
Belgium		Observed DST in 1916–1940, 1942–1946 and since 1977.
Belize	1983	Observed DST in 1973–1974 and 1982–1983.
Bermuda		Observed DST since 1974.
Bolivia	1932	Observed DST in 1931–1932.
Bosnia and Herzegovina		Observed DST in 1916–1918 when it was part of Austria-Hungary, in 1941–1945 and since 1983 when it was part of Yugoslavia or independent.
Brazil	2019	Observed DST in 1931–1933, 1949–1953, 1963–1968, and 1985–2019.
British Borneo	1941	Observed DST in 1935–1941 with a shift of 20 minutes.
British Gold Coast	1942	Observed DST in 1936–1942.
British Hong Kong	1979	Observed DST in 1941, 1945–1976, and 1979.
British Malaya	1935	Observed DST in 1933–1935 by adding 20 minutes to standard time. On January 1, 1936, the area changed its time zone to UTC+07:20.
British Raj	1945	Observed DST during World War II from 1941 to 1945.
Bulgaria		Observed DST in 1943–1944 and since 1979.
Canada		Main article: Daylight saving time in Canada DST observed in the Atlantic provinces, and most of Nunavut, Ontario and Quebec. Abolished in most of Saskatchewan around 1960, parts of British Columbia in 1972 and 2015, Yukon in 2020, Alberta, Manitoba, Northwest Territories, the rest of British Columbia and Saskatchewan, and part of Ontario in 2026.
Chad	1980	Observed DST in winter 1979–1980.
Chile		Observed DST in 1927–1946 (excluding Easter Island, which observed it in 1932–1946) and again, as consequence of hydropower scarcity during the Great Drought of 1968, from 1968 to 2015. Chile observed year-round DST in 2015, but reintroduced regular DST in 2016. Magallanes Region since December 2016 and Aysén Region since March 2025 do not observe DST.
China	1991	Observed DST in 1940–1941 (when it was Republic of China) and 1986–1991.
Colombia	1993	Observed DST in 1992–1993.
Cook Islands	1991	Observed DST in 1978–1991.
Costa Rica	1992	Observed DST in 1954, 1979–1980 and 1991–1992.
Croatia		Observed DST in 1916–1918 when it was part of Austria-Hungary, in 1941–1945 and since 1983 when it was part of Yugoslavia or independent.
Cuba		Observed DST in 1928, 1940–1942, 1945–1946, and since 1965.
Cyprus		Observed DST since 1975.
Czech Republic		Observed DST in 1916–1918 when it was part of Austria-Hungary, 1940–1949 and since 1979 when it was part of Czechoslovakia or independent.
Denmark		Observed DST in 1916, 1940–1948, and since 1980.
Dominican Republic	1974	Observed DST in 1966–1967, 1969–1974.
Egypt		Observed DST in 1940–1945, 1957–2010, 2014, and since 2023.
El Salvador	1988	Observed DST in 1987–1988.
Estonia		Observed DST in 1918, 1940–1944, 1981–1988, 1997–1999, and since 2002.
Faroe Islands		Observed DST since 1981.
Falkland Islands	2010	Observed DST in 1937–1942 and 1983–2010.
Fiji	2021	Main article: Daylight saving time in Fiji Observed DST in 1998–2000 and 2009–2021.
Finland		Observed DST in 1942 and since 1981.
France		Observed DST in 1916–1945 and since 1976.
French Madagascar	1954	Observed DST in 1954.
Georgia	2005	Observed DST in 1981–2005.
Germany		Observed DST in 1916–1918, 1940–1949, and since 1980.
Greece		Observed DST in 1932–1952 and since 1975.
Greenland		Observed DST since 1980. Follows European Union practice as part of the Kingdom of Denmark, hence start and end times correspond to 01:00 UTC on the respective Sunday. See Daylight saving time in the Americas—Greenland. The Pituffik Space Base uses the DST schedule of the United States. Stations on the east coast of Northeast Greenland National Park do not observe DST. (Note: The government of Greenland specified that the portion of Greenland observing UTC−3 would change its standard time to UTC−2 in March 2023, not observe DST in 2023, and resume observing DST in future years as UTC−1 from March to October.)
Guatemala	2006	Observed DST in 1973–1974, 1983, 1991, and 2006.
Guernsey		Observed DST in 1916–1968 and since 1972.
Haiti		Observed DST in 1983–1997, 2005–2006, 2012–2015, and since 2017.
Honduras	2006	Observed DST in 1987–1988 and 2006.
Hungary		Observed DST in 1916–1920, 1941–1950, 1954–1957, and since 1980.
Iceland	1968	Observed DST in 1917–1918 and 1939–1968.
Iraq	2007	Observed DST in 1982–2007.
Iran	2022	Main article: Daylight saving time in Iran Observed DST in 1977–1980, 1991–2005, and 2008–2022.
Ireland		Observed DST in 1916–1968 and since 1972.
Isle of Man		Observed DST in 1916–1968 and since 1972.
Israel		Main article: Israel Summer Time Observed DST in 1940–1946, 1948–1957, 1974–1975, 1980, and since 1984.
Italy		Observed DST in 1916–1920, 1940–1948, and since 1966.
Jamaica	1983	Observed DST in 1974–1983.
Japan	1951	Observed DST in 1948–1951.
Jersey		Observed DST in 1916–1968 and since 1971.
Jordan	2022	Observed DST with annual time changes in 1973–1978 and 1985–2011, permanently in 2012–2013, with annual time changes in 2014–2022, and permanently since 2022.
Kazakhstan	2004	Observed DST in 1981–1990 and 1992–2004.
Kosovo		Observed DST 1941–1945 and since 1983 when it was part of Yugoslavia, Serbia and Montenegro, Serbia or independent.
Kyrgyzstan	2005	Observed DST in 1981–2005.
Latvia		Observed DST in 1918–1919, 1941–1944, 1981–1999, and since 2001.
Lebanon		Observed DST in 1920–1923, 1957–1961, 1972–1978, and since 1984.
Libya	2013	Observed DST in 1951–1959, 1982–1989, 1996–1997, and 2012–2013.
Liechtenstein		Observed DST since 1981.
Lithuania		Observed DST in 1941–1944, 1981–1999, and since 2003.
Luxembourg		Observed DST in 1916–1946 and since 1977.
Malta		Observed DST in 1916–1920, 1940–1948, and since 1966.
Martinique	1980	Observed DST in 1980.
Mauritius	2009	Observed DST in 1982–1983 and 2008–2009.
Mexico		Main article: Daylight saving time in Mexico Baja California started observing DST in 1942. Durango, Coahuila, Nuevo León and Tamaulipas observed DST in 1988. The whole country started observing DST in 1996, but Sonora discontinued the observance after 1998, Quintana Roo after 2014, and the rest of the country after 2022, except Baja California and municipalities near the U.S. border in Chihuahua, Coahuila, Nuevo León and Tamaulipas, which continued observing DST according to the U.S. schedule.
Midway Atoll	1956	Observed DST in 1956.
Moldova		Observed DST in 1932–1944, 1981–1989, and since 1991.
Monaco		Observed DST in 1916–1945 and since 1976.
Mongolia	2016	Observed DST in 1983–1998, 2001–2006, and 2015–2016.
Montenegro		Observed DST 1941–1945 and since 1983 when it was part of Yugoslavia, Serbia and Montenegro or independent.
Morocco	2026	Observed DST in 1939–1945, 1950, 1967, 1974, 1976–1978, and 2008–2018. In 2012–2018, DST was suspended during the month of Ramadan. In 2018–2026, Morocco used UTC+1 almost all year, equivalent to permanent DST, except during the month of Ramadan, when it observed UTC±0. Morocco returned to UTC±0 permanently on 20 September 2026.
Namibia	2017	Adopted standard time of UTC+2 in 1903. Observed annual changes to summer time in 1942–1943 (UTC+3 summer, UTC+2 standard). Observed annual changes to winter time in 1994–2017 (UTC+2 standard, UTC+1 winter) in all regions except Zambezi, which remained in UTC+2 all year.
Netherlands		Observed DST in 1916–1945 and since 1977.
New Caledonia	1997	Observed DST in 1977–1979 and 1996–1997.
New Zealand		From 1927 to 1946, DST was observed as a half-hour shift from UTC+11.5 to UTC+12. From 1946 to 1974, DST was not observed, with GMT+12 becoming New Zealand Standard Time. From 1974 to 1990, DST became a one-hour shift from UTC+12 to UTC+13, observed from the first Sunday in November to the last Sunday in February. From 1990 to 2007, DST was observed from the first Sunday in October to the third Sunday in March. Since 2007, DST is observed from the last Sunday in September to the first Sunday in April.
Nicaragua	2006	Observed DST in 1973–1975, 1979–1980, 1992–1994, and 2005–2006.
Norfolk Island		Observed DST in 1974–1975 and since 2019.
North Macedonia		Observed DST in 1941–1945 and since 1983 when it was part of Yugoslavia or independent.
Northern Cyprus		Observed DST since 2017. Maintained permanent DST from September 2016 to October 2017.
Norway		Observed DST in 1916, 1940–1945, 1959–1965, and since 1980. Follows European Union practice, although not a member.
Pakistan	2009	Observed DST in 1942–1945 as part of the British Raj. Also observed in 2002 and from 2008 to 2009.
Palestine		Since 1974, observed DST in the same years when Israel did, but not always with the same start and end dates.
Paraguay	2024	Observed DST in 1975–2024. In October 2024 adopted UTC−3, equivalent to permanent DST.
Peru	1994	Observed DST in 1938–1940, 1986–1987, 1990, and 1994.
Philippines	1990	Observed DST in 1936–1937, 1954, 1977, and 1990. Year-round DST + Japan Standard Time 1941–1945.
Poland		Observed DST in 1916–1919, 1940–1949, 1957–1964, and since 1977.
Portugal		Observed DST in 1916–1921, 1924, 1926–1929, 1931–1932, 1934–1949, 1951–1965, and since 1977.
Portuguese Cape Verde	1945	Observed DST in 1942–1945.
Portuguese Macau	1979	Observed DST in 1941–1943, 1945–1976 and 1979.
Puerto Rico	1945	Observed DST in 1942–1945.
Romania		First time when DST was observed in Romania was in 1917, due to World War I. Observed DST in 1932–1939 and since 1979.
Russia	2014	Observed DST in 1917–1919, 1921 (some areas), and 1981–2010. In 2011–2014, used permanent DST. In 2014, left permanent DST and switched to permanent standard time.
Saint Pierre and Miquelon		Observed DST since 1987.
Samoa	2021	Main article: Daylight saving time in Samoa Observed DST in 2010–2021.
San Marino		Observed DST in 1916–1920, 1940–1948, and since 1966.
Serbia		Observed DST in 1941–1945 and since 1983 when it was part of Yugoslavia, Serbia and Montenegro or independent.
Sierra Leone	1962	Observed DST in 1933–1942 and 1957–1962.
Slovakia		Observed DST in 1916–1918 when it was part of Austria-Hungary, 1940–1949 and since 1979 when it was part of Czechoslovakia or independent.
Slovenia		Observed DST in 1916–1918 when it was part of Austria-Hungary, in 1941–1945 and since 1983 when it was part of Yugoslavia or independent.
South Africa	1944	Observed DST in 1942–1944.
South Korea	1988	Observed DST in 1948–1951, 1955–1960, and 1987–1988.
Soviet Union	1991	Observed DST in 1981–1991.
Spain		Observed DST in 1917–1919, 1924, 1926–1929, 1937–1946, 1949, and since 1974. The Canary Islands observed DST since 1980.
Sri Lanka	2006	Observed DST during the World War II, from 1942 to 1945 just as the rest of the Indian subcontinent. Advanced one hour to UTC+6:30 in May 1996, reduced 30 minutes to UTC+6 in October 1996, and reduced 30 minutes to UTC+5:30 in April 2006.
Sudan	1985	Observed DST in 1970–1985.
Sweden		Observed DST 15 May–30 September 1916, in a test run. Observed DST since 1980. Dates: 1980, first Sunday of April to last Sunday of September; 1981–1995, last Sunday of March to last Sunday of September; since 1996, last Sunday of March to last Sunday of October.
Switzerland		Observed DST in 1941–1942 and since 1981. Follows European Union practice, although not a member.
Syria	2022	Observed DST in 1920–1923, 1962–1978, 1983–1984, and 1986–2022. In 2022 switched to UTC+03:00, equivalent to permanent DST.
Taiwan	1979	Observed DST in 1945–1962, 1974, 1975, and 1979.
Tonga	2017	Observed DST in 1999–2002 and 2016–2017.
Tunisia	2008	Observed DST in 1939–1945, 1977–1978, 1988–1990, and 2005–2008.
Türkiye (Turkey)	2016	Main article: Daylight saving time in Turkey Observed DST in 1916, 1920–1922, 1924–1925, 1940–1942, 1945–1951, 1962, 1964, 1970–1983, and 1985–2016. Followed European Union practice in general. In 2016, Turkey adopted the new Turkey Time time zone (UTC+03:00), moving in effect to permanent DST.
Turks and Caicos		Observed DST in 1979–2015 and since 2018.
Ukraine		Observed DST in 1941–1943, 1981–1989, and since 1992. Follows European Union practice, although not a member. Since 2014, occupied territories of Ukraine do not de facto observe DST.
United Kingdom		Main article: British Summer Time Observed DST (commonly referred to as British Summer Time (BST)) since 1916. Year-round Summer Time (BST) + Double Summer Time (BDST) 1940–1945. Two-stage Double Summer Time (BDST) 1947. Year-round Summer Time (BST) 1968–1971. Follows European Union practice, although no longer a member.
United States		Main article: Daylight saving time in the United States Arizona (except the Navajo Nation), Hawaii and U.S. territories do not observe DST. Year-round DST observed in 1942–1945, and extended to part of winter in 1974–1975. DST was not observed in Michigan in 1969–1972 and in most of Indiana in 1971–2005.
Uruguay	2015	Observed DST in 1923–1926, 1933–1943, 1959–1960, 1965–1970, 1972, 1974–1980, 1987–1993, and 2004–2015.
Vanuatu	1993	Observed DST in 1983–1993.
Vatican City		Observed DST in 1916–1920, 1940–1948, and since 1966.
Western Sahara	2026	The portion administered by Morocco since 1976 observed DST whenever the country did.

== Proposals to abolish seasonal changes ==
Many countries and territories have abolished annual time changes after observing them for many years: Argentina, Armenia, Azerbaijan, Belarus, Brazil, Cook Islands, Falkland Islands, Fiji, Georgia, Hong Kong, Iceland, Iran, Iraq, Jamaica, Jordan, Kazakhstan, Kyrgyzstan, Macau, Mongolia, Morocco, Namibia, Paraguay, Russia, Samoa, Sudan, Syria, Turkey, Uruguay, Vanuatu, most of Mexico, and parts of Canada. To select the time to be used all year, some of them adopted the time previously used outside their DST period, but others adopted the time previously used during their DST period, an effect known as "permanent DST".

=== Canada ===
In 2026, many parts of Canada abolished seasonal time changes: British Columbia, Alberta, Northwest Territories, Manitoba, and parts of Saskatchewan and Ontario. Proposals to abolish time changes were also considered in Nunavik, Nunavut and Quebec.

=== European Union ===
On 8 February 2018, the European Parliament voted to ask the European Commission to re-evaluate DST in the European Union. An online survey was performed between 4 July and 16 August 2018, in which 4.6 million EU citizens responded. The survey was especially popular in Germany, resulting in 68% of all respondents located in that country. Out of all the participants, about 84% did not desire to adjust clocks twice annually. Based on this poll, on 12 September 2018 the European Commission decided to propose an end to seasonal clock changes (repealing Directive 2000/84/EC). In order for this proposal to be valid, the European Union legislative procedure must be followed, mainly that the Council of the European Union and the European Parliament must both approve it.

The seasonal changes were supposed to stop in 2021, but the Council of the European Union asked the European Commission for a detailed impact assessment before countries would decide on how to proceed. The European Parliament debated the subject in October 2025.

=== United States ===
Since 2018, several U.S. states have passed laws to abolish seasonal changes and adopt permanent DST, but these laws cannot take effect without approval from the federal government. States may freely choose whether to observe DST or not, but if they observe it they must follow the national schedule, and changing their standard time also requires approval from the federal government.

The proposed Sunshine Protection Act would change federal law to abolish annual time changes and permanently advance by one hour the standard time in all areas of the United States that previously observed DST, effectively adopting permanent DST. The proposal has been introduced in every term of the United States Congress since 2018. In 2022, it passed the Senate with unanimous consent but expired without further consideration. In July 2026, it passed the House of Representatives.

== See also ==
- Daylight saving time in Africa
- Daylight saving time in the Americas
- Daylight saving time in Asia
- Daylight saving time in Oceania
- Lists of time zones
- Summer time in Europe
- Time zone
- UTC offset
- Winter time (clock lag)
