= Time in Indonesia =

- Map of time zones of Indonesia
- Western Indonesia Time (WIB) UTC offset: UTC+07:00 (WIB+0)
- Central Indonesia Time (WITA) UTC offset: UTC+08:00 (WIB+1)
- Eastern Indonesia Time (WIT) UTC offset: UTC+09:00 (WIB+2)
- Adopted: 1 January 1988
- Time notation: 24-hour clock
- tz database: Asia/Jakarta · Asia/Pontianak · Asia/Makassar · Asia/Jayapura

The Republic of Indonesia, a country located in Southeast Asia has three time zones. Western Indonesia Time (Waktu Indonesia Barat, WIB) is seven hours ahead (UTC+07:00) of the Coordinated Universal Time (UTC), used in the islands of Sumatra, Java, and the western half of Kalimantan. Central Indonesia Time (Waktu Indonesia Tengah, WITA) is eight hours ahead (UTC+08:00), used in the eastern half of Kalimantan, as well as all of Bali, the Lesser Sunda Islands, and Sulawesi. Eastern Indonesia Time (Waktu Indonesia Timur, WIT) is nine hours ahead (UTC+09:00), used in the Maluku Islands and Western New Guinea. About 80% of the Indonesian population live in WIB (UTC+07:00).

In 1908, during the Dutch East Indies colonial era, only Java and the Madura Island were initially given time until 1932, when the government utilised UTC+06:30 up to +09:30. In between those changes in 1918, Central Java (UTC+07:20, now defunct) was the basis for time in select locations: for instance, Padang was 7 minutes behind Central Java. The Japanese occupation of the Indies prompted the simplification of time in Indonesia to just UTC+09:00, also known as the Japan Standard Time. The Dutch reoccupied the country following its 1945 independence with UTC+06:00 up to +09:00 established, but it was reverted to the 1932 system after they recognised Indonesia's sovereignty. The current time zone division is a 1988 revision of a 1964 division, with Bali, West Kalimantan, and Central Kalimantan changing sides. Without any significant season changes, the daylight saving time system is not observed anywhere in Indonesia, as is other Southeast Asian countries.

== Current usage ==
Indonesia is divided into three time zones:

Time zone name	Original name	UTC offset	WIB offset	Provinces covered
Western Indonesia Time (WIB)	Waktu Indonesia Barat	UTC+07:00	WIB+/-0h	Aceh, Bengkulu, Jambi, Lampung, North Sumatra, Riau, South Sumatra, West Sumatra, Riau Islands, Bangka Belitung Islands, Banten, Jakarta, West Java, Central Java, Special Region of Yogyakarta, East Java, West Kalimantan, and Central Kalimantan
Central Indonesia Time (WITA)	Waktu Indonesia Tengah	UTC+08:00	WIB+1h	South Kalimantan, East Kalimantan, North Kalimantan, North Sulawesi, Gorontalo Central Sulawesi, West Sulawesi, South Sulawesi, Southeast Sulawesi, Bali, West Nusa Tenggara, and East Nusa Tenggara
Eastern Indonesia Time (WIT)	Waktu Indonesia Timur	UTC+09:00	WIB+2h	Maluku, North Maluku, Central Papua, Highland Papua, Papua, South Papua, Southwest Papua and West Papua

These time zones have existed in their present form since 1 January 1988.

== History ==
=== Early timekeeping ===
The first regulation of time was implemented in 1908 at the request of the Staatsspoorwegen Dutch railway company in Java during the time of the Dutch East Indies. The time in Central Java was set at 12 minutes later than the capital, Batavia, which used GMT +7 hours. This regulation, which came into effect on 1 May 1908, applied only to Java and Madura. Time in the rest of the archipelago remained unregulated.

Ten years later, on 22 February 1918, time in Padang, Sumatra was set at 39 minutes ahead of Central Java, while time in Palembang was set at 8 hours and 20 minutes ahead of Greenwich Mean Time. Then, on 1 January 1924, times for various locations were set as follows:

Location	Time
Central Java	GMT +7:20
Tapanoeli Residency	Central Java −45 min (GMT +6:35)
Padang	Central Java −7 min (GMT +7:13)
Bali and Lombok	Central Java +22 min (GMT +7:44)
Makassar	Central Java +38 min (GMT +7:58)

=== Standardised time zones ===
In 1932, the Dutch colonial government through a Governments Besluit dated 27 July published in Staatsblad No. 412, divided the entire colony into six time zones separated by 30 minutes as follows:

Time zone	in Dutch	UTC offset	Locations	Dates observed
Northern Sumatra Time	Noord-Sumatra tijd	UTC+06:30	Aceh, Padang, and Medan	
Southern Sumatra Time	Zuid-Sumatra tijd	UTC+07:00	Bengkulu, Palembang, and Lampung	
Java Time	Java tijd	UTC+07:30	Java, Bali, Madura and Kalimantan	
Celebes Time	Celebes tijd	UTC+08:00	Sulawesi and Lesser Sunda Islands	
Moluccan Time	Molukken tijd	UTC+08:30	Ternate, Namlea, Ambon, and Banda	
New Guinea Time	Nieuw-Guinea tijd	UTC+09:00	West Irian	1 Nov 1932 to 31 Aug 1944.
Dutch New Guinea Time	Nederlandse Nieuw-Guinea tijd	UTC+09:30	West Irian (then still named Dutch New Guinea) was still controlled by the Dutch.	1 Sept 1944 to 31 Dec 1963.

During the Japanese occupation of the Dutch East Indies, from 27 March 1942 to 24 September 1945, both western and central parts of Indonesia used Japan Standard Time (JST) (UTC+09:00) for the sake of the effectiveness of Japanese military operations in Indonesia.

=== Time zones post-independence ===
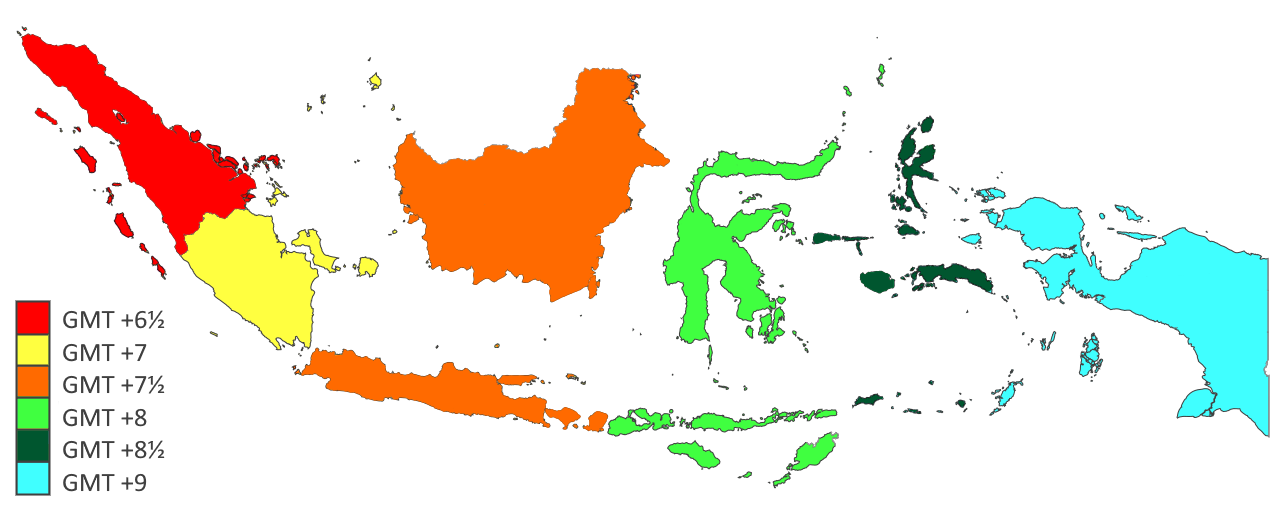
The time zones in effect from 1932 to 1942 and 1950–1963

When the Dutch returned in 1945, they reimposed three time zones (GMT +6, +7 and +8), with a separate GMT +9 time zone for Dutch New Guinea. Following Dutch recognition of Indonesian sovereignty, a presidential regulation came into effect on 1 May 1950 once again dividing the country into six time zones separated by half an hour. Then, on 1 January 1964, another presidential decree came into effect, imposing the current system of three time zones. The final change came on 1 January 1988 when Bali was moved out of the West Indonesia time zone into the Central Indonesia time zone, and West and Central Kalimantan were transferred from Central to West Indonesian Time.

=== 2012 proposal for a single time zone ===
On 12 March 2012, Coordinating Minister for the Economy Hatta Rajasa said: "according to research, with a single time zone the country could cut costs by trillions of rupiah." Two months later, The Jakarta Post reported that a single time zone using UTC+08:00 may start on 28 October 2012. However, in August, the Jakarta Globe reported that the plan was now on hold. In January 2013, a deputy minister said the idea had been abandoned after missing two target dates: 17 August (Independence day) and 28 October 2012 (Youth Pledge day). Later that year, Rajasa claimed that the plan had not been abandoned, although there was no deadline for implementation.

== IANA time zone database ==
In the IANA time zone database, Indonesia is given four zones in the file zone.tab: Asia/Jakarta serving Sumatra and Java; Asia/Pontianak serving West and Central Kalimantan; Asia/Makassar serving East Kalimantan, South Kalimantan, the Lesser Sunda Islands, and Sulawesi; and Asia/Jayapura serving the Maluku Islands, Papua, and West Papua. The first two zones use WIB, while the third and last use WITA and WIT, respectively.

c.c.	Coordinates	Timezone name	Comments	UTC offset	Abbreviation
ID	−0610+10648	Asia/Jakarta	Java, Sumatra	+07:00	WIB
ID	−0002+10920	Asia/Pontianak	Borneo (west, central)	+07:00	WIB
ID	−0507+11924	Asia/Makassar	Borneo (east, south), Sulawesi/Celebes, Bali, Nusa Tengarra, Timor (west)	+08:00	WITA
ID	−0232+14042	Asia/Jayapura	New Guinea (West Papua / Irian Jaya), Malukus/Moluccas	+09:00	WIT

== See also ==
- ASEAN Common Time
- Time in Brunei
- Philippine Standard Time
- Singapore Standard Time
- Time in Malaysia
- Time in Thailand
- Time in South Korea
- Japan Standard Time
- Time in China
