= Daylight saving time in Canada =

Canadian daylight saving time
- Observed by: New Brunswick; Newfoundland and Labrador; Nova Scotia; Nunavut (mostly); Ontario (mostly); Prince Edward Island; Quebec (mostly)
- Begins: Second Sunday in March
- Ends: First Sunday in November
- 2025 date: March 9 – November 2
- 2026 date: March 8 – November 1
- 2027 date: March 14 – November 7
- First time: 1908; 118 years ago
- Related to: Daylight saving time

In Canada, daylight saving time (DST) is observed in most of Eastern Canada and Nunavut. In 2026, British Columbia, Alberta, Manitoba, and the Northwest Territories abolished biannual clock changes, choosing to remain on DST year-round. They joined Saskatchewan and Yukon, which had made similar changes in 1966 and 2020, respectively.

Under the Canadian Constitution, laws related to timekeeping are a provincial and territorial matter. In the regions of Canada that use daylight saving time, it begins on the second Sunday of March at 2 a.m. and ends on the first Sunday in November at 2 a.m. As a result, daylight saving time in Canada lasts for a total of 34 weeks (238 days) every year, about 65 percent of the entire year.

== By province and territory ==
Time zones of Canada. Pale coloured areas observe daylight saving time and dark coloured areas do not.

The provinces and territories that observe DST as of November 2026 are:

- New Brunswick
- Newfoundland and Labrador
- Nova Scotia
- Nunavut (excluding Southampton Island)
- Ontario (excluding some northwestern regions)
- Prince Edward Island
- Quebec (excluding some northeastern regions)

=== Alberta, Saskatchewan and Northwest Territories ===
Although Alberta and Saskatchewan are geographically within the Pacific Time Zone and Mountain Time Zone, both provinces officially observe Central Time year-round. Alberta characterizes its timezone as permanent Mountain Daylight Time, which in effect is the same as permanent Central Standard Time.

The Saskatchewan Time Act of 1966 designated the use of CST year-round for eastern Saskatchewan and allowed western parts of the province to use MST year-round. By 1972, most western regions of the province had switched from MST to CST. The exception was the area around the city of Lloydminster, which is bisected by the Saskatchewan–Alberta boundary, which kept in sync with time in Alberta until Alberta itself changed its time observance practice to match Saskatchewan's. An unofficial exception also existed in the east of the province where the small, remote Saskatchewan towns of Denare Beach and Creighton observed Central Daylight Time during the summer to keep the same time as larger neighbouring Manitoba communities, until Manitoba itself changed its time observance practice to one hour ahead of Saskatchewan year-round.

In 1948, the Government of Alberta formally set the province's time zone with the passage of The Daylight Saving Time Act, which mandated the entire province observe Mountain Standard Time (UTC−7) and prevented any municipality from observing daylight saving time or any other time zone. Following a referendum in 1971, this decision was reversed and Alberta began to observe Mountain Daylight Time (UTC−6) in summers beginning in 1972. In 2021, the provincial government held a referendum on permanently adopting daylight saving time, which was narrowly defeated (50.2% against, 49.8% in favour). The referendum did not offer permanent Mountain Standard Time as an option, a limitation critics noted as skewing the framing of the question. The 2026 public consultation formally offered permanent Mountain Standard Time as an alternative, but the government proceeded with permanent MDT – an offset equivalent to Central Standard Time. Following British Columbia's move to permanent Pacific Daylight Time in March 2026, the Alberta government conducted public consultations on eliminating biannual clock changes. In April 2026, Premier Danielle Smith acted to permanently adopt Mountain Daylight Time (UTC−6) year-round, characterizing this as Alberta Time. Chronobiologists argue that Alberta's misalignment with solar noon compounds the health effects already associated with permanent summer time, including elevated risks to cardiovascular health, sleep, and metabolic function.

In March 2021, the Northwest Territories passed legislation to eliminate daylight saving time, pending a public consultation that was held in 2022. Respondents were overwhelmingly in favour of eliminating DST with a slight majority in favour of adopting permanent daylight time. In 2026, Premier R.J. Simpson announced that the territory would adopt UTC−6 year-round. A key motivation for the change was remaining in sync with Alberta due to close economic and cultural links. The change took effect on August 21, 2026.

=== Atlantic Canada ===
In 2022, the premiers of New Brunswick, Newfoundland and Labrador, Prince Edward Island, and Nova Scotia discussed the possibility of adopting permanent daylight time. Their discussion followed the US Senate passing a bill to make DST permanent; this bill died in the US House of Representatives. In 2026, the premier of Nova Scotia stated that adopting permanent DST was a possibility but only in conjunction with the other Atlantic provinces.

=== British Columbia and Yukon ===
Most of British Columbia (BC) and all of Yukon functionally follow Mountain Standard Time (UTC−07:00) and do not observe DST. British Columbia calls its time zone Pacific Time, while Yukon calls its observance Yukon Standard Time.

In 2020, Yukon abandoned seasonal time changes, moving to year-round UTC−7.

On March 2, 2026, British Columbia premier David Eby announced the end of daylight saving time for the majority of the province, which will see the bulk of the province observe permanent UTC−7, a time observance identical to the Peace River region and neighbouring Yukon.

=== Manitoba ===
Time in Manitoba, all of which runs on Central Time, is dictated by the province's Official Time Act.

In 1916, Brandon and Winnipeg became two of seven cities in Canada to use daylight saving time before 1918, by local ordinance.

On September 17, 2026, Manitoba announced they would stay on permanent daylight time and no longer change their clocks twice a year, resulting in an offset equivalent to Eastern Standard Time (UTC–05:00).

=== Nunavut ===
The territory of Nunavut has three time zones: Mountain Time in the west, Central Time in the centre and, Eastern Time in the east. Daylight saving time is observed throughout Nunavut except for Southampton Island, including Coral Harbour, and Eureka, which is a permanent research station on Ellesmere Island; both remain on Eastern Standard Time year-round.

=== Ontario ===
Most of Ontario uses DST. Pickle Lake, Atikokan, and New Osnaburgh are three communities within the Central Time Zone in northwestern Ontario that observe Eastern Standard Time year-round. In October 2026, the government of Ontario announced that the remaining communities in the Central Time Zone would adopt permanent DST following consultations.

Ontario was the site of the first municipality in the world to enact DST: Port Arthur on July 1, 1908. Similarly, Hamilton subsequently became one of seven cities in Canada to use daylight saving time before 1918, by local ordinance.

In November 2020, the Legislative Assembly of Ontario passed Bill 214, the Time Amendment Act, 2020, which will establish year-round observation of daylight saving time. However, the act does not come into force immediately but takes effect on a day to be named by proclamation of the Ontario lieutenant governor under the advisory of the province's attorney general. That is intended to avoid moving to a different time zone from the one that is used in Quebec or New York.

=== Quebec ===
Most of Quebec is on Eastern Time and observes DST. However, there are three exceptions, all of which are legally accommodated by the province's Time Act of 2006:

- The Magdalen Islands are on Atlantic Time and observe DST.
- The Listuguj Reserve is on Atlantic Time and observes DST.
- Le Golfe-du-Saint-Laurent Regional County Municipality observes Atlantic Standard Time all year.

In the early 20th century, Montreal became one of seven cities in Canada to use daylight saving time before 1918, by local ordinance.

In November 2025, Makivvik announced that Nunavik would adopt Eastern Daylight time year-round beginning in March 2026. However this has since been delayed to a target of November 2027. In October 2026, the government of Quebec stated their intention to eliminate biannual clock changes province-wide in 2027.

== See also ==
- Time in Canada
- Daylight saving time by country
