= Daylight saving time in Argentina =

Since 2009, Argentina is not observing daylight saving time (DST) and the entire country stays on UTC-03:00.

San Luis Province, which was previously in a different time zone than most of the country and which formerly observed DST, decided in April 2010 not to change its clocks back and to stay on UTC-03:00 all year round.

The most recent history of Argentina observing DST was from 2007 to 2009. After a period of not observing DST, Argentina observed DST in some provinces in an attempt to save energy. For each period, the executive branch of the government set the specific start and end dates for DST, i.e. there was no fixed annual schedule.

== See also ==
- Daylight saving time by country
- Time in Argentina
