= Time in South Korea =

- Time zone

UTC offset
- KST: UTC+09:00

Current time
- :: KST [refresh]

Observance of DST
- DST is not observed in this time zone.

- Korea Standard Time
- Hangul: 한국 표준시
- Hanja: 韓國標準時
- RR: Hanguk pyojunsi
- MR: Han'guk p'yojunsi

South Korea has one time zone, Korea Standard Time (UTC+9), which is abbreviated KST. South Korea currently does not observe daylight saving time (DST).

DST was trialled, as "Korea Daylight Time" (KDT), during three separate periods: from 1948–1951 (as UTC+10:00), 1955–1960 (as UTC+09:30), and from 1987–1988 (again as UTC+10) – observed, on each occasion, in the warmer months only.

From May 8 to October 9, 1988, daylight saving time was tested in its final iteration (continuing from the trial run of 1987) to better accommodate the calendar of competitions held during the 1988 Summer Olympics in Seoul.

== History ==
In 1434, inventor Chang Yŏngsil developed Korea's first automatic water clock, which King Sejong adapted as Korea's standard timekeeper. It is likely that Koreans used water clocks to keep time prior to this invention, but no concrete records of them exist. In 1437, Chang Yŏngsil, with Chŏng Ch'o, created a bowl-shaped sundial called the angbu ilgu (앙부일구), which King Sejong had placed in public so anyone could use it.

In 1908, the Korean Empire adopted a standard time, GMT+08:30. In 1912, during the Japanese occupation of Korea, the Governor-General of Korea changed standard time to GMT+09:00 to align with Japan Standard Time. However, in 1954, the South Korean government under President Syngman Rhee reverted the standard time to GMT+08:30. Then in 1961, under the military government of President Park Chung-hee, the standard time was changed back to GMT+09:00 once again.

In order to accommodate American television viewers, South Korea observed daylight saving time (GMT+10:00) when Seoul hosted the 1988 Summer Olympics. The one-hour time change meant that many daytime events could be broadcast live from South Korea when it was prime time on the U.S. east coast.

North Korea also uses Korea Standard Time. From August 2015 to May 2018, North Korea changed its time zone to GMT+08:30, a time zone known as Pyongyang Standard Time, but the change was reverted to promote Korean unity.

== IANA time zone database ==
The IANA time zone database contains one zone for South Korea in the file zone.tab, named Asia/Seoul.
