= Daylight saving time in Bolivia =

Since 2011, Bolivia was going to apply the time change from September 1 for the first time in its history, advancing the clock 60 minutes throughout the national territory, in order to offset their energy problems. The schedule change would take place every year between September and March, corresponding to the spring and summer of the South American country.

However, on August 31, 2011 (on the eve of the failed schedule change), the national government of that country indefinitely suspended the summer time, due to opposition from experts in electricity, neighborhood and school leaders and the people themselves put.

== See also ==
- Daylight saving time by country
- Time in Argentina
- Time in Paraguay
- Time in Uruguay
