= Daylight saving time in Guatemala =

Guatemala currently does not observe daylight saving time, and uses Central Standard Time (UTC−06:00) all year-round. Daylight saving time (Central Daylight Time (CDT), UTC−05:00) has been observed in a few previous years, the last occasion being in 2006.

CDT was observed for the following periods:

- 25 November 1973 – 24 February 1974
- 21 May 1983 – 22 September 1983
- 23 March 1991 – 7 September 1991
- 30 April 2006 – 1 October 2006

== See also ==
- Daylight saving time by country
