= Daylight saving time in Samoa =

Daylight saving time (DST) was observed in the country of Samoa from 2010 to 2021 before being abolished.

== History of Samoa's time zone placement ==
On October 13, 1884, at the International Meridian Conference, a vote from 26 countries declared the 180th meridian or antimeridian to be located 180 degrees around the globe from the prime meridian. While this placed Samoa in the Western Hemisphere east of -180 degrees longitude, the islands remained west of a zigzagging International Date Line that veered from the antimeridian. In 1892, three years after Samoa gained an autonomous government, King Mālietoa Laupepa was persuaded by American traders to approve a readjustment in the International Date Line, its reconfiguration now passing west of the islands. It was announced on June 16, 1892, that Monday, July 4, a symbolic date celebrated as Independence Day in the United States, would be observed on two consecutive days in Samoa to accommodate for the shift across the date line.

When Coordinated Universal Time (UTC) was first adopted in 1963, Samoa was part of the UTC-11:00 time zone, its time being 11 hours earlier than Greenwich Mean Time as the country had been east of the International Date Line since 1892. Daylight saving time was proposed by Samoan Parliament in 2007, but the measure was eventually dismissed. However, in an effort to save energy, improve the economy, enhance leisure time, and support plantation farming, the proposal was reintroduced in 2009.

== Samoa adopts Daylight Saving Time ==
With DST dating back to 1916 Germany, the practice was finally adopted by Samoa in late November of 2008 after approval from the nation’s Cabinet. Moving clocks forward one hour was scheduled for midnight of Sunday, October 4, 2009, a few months before the official beginning of summer in the Southern Hemisphere. The DST period was scheduled to conclude nearly six months later at midnight on Sunday, March 28, 2010. But after a tsunami struck the nation on September 29, 2009, five days before the implementation of DST, the planned introduction was postponed.

On Sunday, September 26, 2010, DST was finally instituted in Samoa when clocks were readjusted forward from midnight to 1:00 a.m., advancing the country from UTC-11:00 to UTC-10:00 for the next six months. On Saturday, April 2, 2011, Samoa’s first DST period ended when clocks were moved backward from 4:00 a.m. to 3:00 a.m., reverting to the UTC-11:00 time zone. The country’s Electric Power Corporation calculated that energy demand had indeed decreased significantly during DST, saving roughly 319,000 liters (84,271 gallons) of fuel in the span of three months possibly attributed to the new time change policy.

== Time zone change in 2011 ==
Later in 2011, Samoa initiated its second period of DST at 3:00 a.m. on Saturday, September 24. Once again, clocks advanced to 4:00 a.m. (or UTC-10:00). However, at the end of the day on Thursday, December 29, 2011, the International Date Line was moved back to the east of Samoa to better align its calendar with major trading partners like China, Australia, and New Zealand. Additionally, a large Samoan population inhabits New Zealand, and families were split across the old configuration of the International Date Line.

The alteration advanced the time in Samoa by 24 hours, changing time zones from UTC-10:00 to UTC+14:00. With much celebration and fanfare in the community at midnight to end December 29, the date instantly transitioned to the morning of Saturday, December 31, 2011, skipping December 30 altogether. All employees scheduled to work on what was now a nonexistent Friday were given a full day’s wage to compensate a lost day of work. But an estimated 500 birthdays of Samoan citizens were lost in the process. The International Date Line was shifted from approximately 84 kilometers (52 miles) west of Samoa to about 40 kilometers (25 miles) east of the islands. The New Zealand territory of Tokelau also made the move with Samoa.

On January 1, 2012, Samoa now joined portions of the country of Kiribati as the first to reach the New Year, the only country in its entirety with that distinction. They maintained that status on an annual basis over the next nine years while DST was still observed in the country.

== DST in Samoa from 2012 to 2021 ==
On Sunday, April 1, 2012, Samoa’s second DST period ended, marked by 4:00 a.m. on the first Sunday of April for the remainder of its observation in Samoa. This moved the country to its new primary time zone of UTC+13:00. When their third DST period was initiated on Sunday, September 30, 2012, this would begin the practice of advancing forward one hour on the last Sunday of September at 3:00 a.m. for the remainder of DST's existence in Samoa. That changed the country's time to 4:00 a.m. (UTC+14:00) each year as DST began.

== The abolition of daylight saving time in Samoa ==
As Samoa's ninth DST concluded on Sunday, April 7, 2019, news began circulating that Samoa might put an end to the practice. Pulotu Lyndon Chu Long, the CEO of the Ministry of Commerce, Industry and Labour, cited a survey indicating that the majority of citizens wanted to abolish DST. The most common complaints included employees showing up late, lost productivity, and children being at greater risk while walking to school in the dark. The practice could not be terminated legally unless approved by Samoa’s Cabinet.

On Easter Sunday, April 4, 2021, Samoa concluded its 11th and final daylight saving time period at 4:00 a.m., permanently reverting to the UTC+13:00 time zone. Just before its 12th iteration would have returned, Samoa’s Cabinet decided in mid-September of 2021 to cease the practice. The official announcement was made Monday, September 20, just six days before DST was scheduled to begin. Now, only parts of Kiribati experience each New Year first in the world, with Samoa welcoming a new calendar year one hour later.

== Bibliography ==
- Howse, Derek (1997). Greenwich Time and the Longitude. Phillip Wilson. ISBN 0-85667-468-0.
