= Daylight saving time in Ecuador =

DST in Ecuador

Ecuador currently doesn't use DST.

President Sixto Durán Ballén imposed daylight saving time in an energy-saving effort. It lasted from November 28, 1992 to February 5, 1993, encompassing most of the southern hemisphere summer. It was poorly received by the populace and did not last long.

== See also ==
- Daylight saving time by country
