= Daylight saving time in Asia =

Currently using DST Formerly used DST (Jordan, West Malaysia, Singapore, Syria and Turkey use year-round DST) Never used DST

As of 2025, daylight saving time is used in the following Asian countries (especially Middle East):

- Cyprus: From last Sunday of March to last Sunday of October; follows EU practice.
- Egypt: From last Friday of April to last Thursday of October.
- Israel: From Friday before the last Sunday of March to last Sunday of October; follows EU practice.
- Lebanon: From last Sunday of March to last Sunday of October.

== By country and regions ==
=== Bangladesh ===
Bangladesh implemented DST in 2009 in an attempt to reduce fuel consumption and curb load shedding. However, negligible effect on electricity availability, complexity, and having to rise before sunrise to reach work made the proposition untenable and it was abandoned in the December of that year.

=== People's Republic of China ===
The People's Republic of China experimented with DST from 1986, but abandoned DST from 1992 onwards. The PRC now uses one time zone (UTC+08:00) for the whole country.

=== Egypt ===
The British first instituted summer time in Egypt in 1940, during the Second World War. The practice was stopped after 1945, but resumed 12 years later, in 1957.

Before the revolution in January 2011, the government was planning to take a decision to abolish summer time in 2011 before President Hosni Mubarak's term expires in September 2011. The transitional government did so on 20 April 2011.

Under the pretext that daylight saving time would save energy, the Egyptian government decided on 7 May 2014 to reinstate summer time with an exception for the holy month of Ramadan. This essentially necessitated clocks to be adjusted four times a year. To know the time, Egyptians had to turn to social media. Meanwhile, certain hotels along the Red Sea disregarded the time changes, opting for "resort time" and effectively establishing a competing time zone. In April the next year, a poll was held on whether to apply summer time or not. Following the results, the government decided on 20 April to temporarily cancel summer time, to make the necessary amendment to the laws and asked the ministers to work on a study to determine the probability of applying DST in coming years or not. The ministry of electricity assured that the achieved electricity savings from applying summer time is not of any tangible effect. Summer time was expected to return in 2016, starting on July 8 (after Ramadan), but on July 5, it was decided to again cancel it. But starting from April 28 until October 25, Egypt started using DST again.

=== Hong Kong ===
Hong Kong used DST beginning in 1941, but abandoned it from 1980 onwards.

=== India ===
India and the Indian subcontinent employed DST during the Second World War, from 1942 to 1945. During the Sino-Indian War of 1962 and the Indo-Pakistani Wars of 1965 and 1971, daylight saving time was briefly observed to minimize civilian energy consumption. Currently, India does not observe DST, and uses just one time zone (UTC+5:30) for the entire country.

=== Indonesia ===
Currently, Indonesia does not observe DST. However, various DST offsets were observed from 1 January 1924 to 1 January 1964.

=== Iran ===
Iran observed DST in 1977–1980, 1991–2005 and 2008-2022 from March 21–22 (1/1 Iranian calendars) to September 21–22 (6/30 Iranian calendars).

=== Israel ===
Israel observed DST in 1940–1946, 1948–1957, 1974–1975 and since 1985. Currently, DST is observed from the Friday before the last Sunday of March to the last Sunday of October.

=== Jordan ===
Jordan observed DST in 1985–2022 from the last Friday of March to the last Friday of October. On 24 October 2012, Jordan decided to continue observing daylight saving time for an entire year, ending in December 2013. On 5 October 2022, Jordan abolished DST, while changing the country's time zone to what used to be summer time (UTC+03:00), effectively scrapping winter time.

=== Kazakhstan ===
Kazakhstan made a decision to stop observing summer time in 2005, citing health complications as well as lowered productivity and a lack of economic benefits.

=== Kyrgyzstan ===
Kyrgyzstan voted to stop observing DST in 2005 and make UTC+06:00 as Standard Time (which used to be Kyrgyzstan Summer Time), thus having permanent DST due to the time zone shift.

=== Lebanon ===
On 28 March 2023, the Lebanese government reversed a decision to delay the shift to daylight saving time by a month. The decision was reportedly to allow Muslim citizens to break their fasts earlier during the holy month of Ramadan. The decision was dismissed later on.

=== Malaysia ===
Malaysia used DST from January 1, 1933, but discontinued on December 31, 1981 to replace DST with Malaysian Standard Time. Other sources claim that Malaysia ceased DST on January 1, 1936, along with Singapore.

=== Philippines ===
Since 1991, the Philippines has not observed daylight saving time. It was in use for short periods (and even long periods during wartime) during the presidencies of Manuel L. Quezon in 1936–1937 and 1941–1944, Sergio Osmeña in 1943–1945, Ramon Magsaysay in 1954, Ferdinand Marcos Sr. in 1977, and Corazon Aquino in 1990.

DST was primarily intended to alleviate energy crises by minimizing the number of hours needed for electric lighting, reducing the strain on the national power grid. As power generation and transmission capacities improved, the practice was abandoned.

Since 1990, there were several proposals submitted to successive government administrations that sought to reintroduce DST:

- In April 2006, the Department of Trade and Industry proposed that DST be reimplemented to help deal with rising oil prices.
- In August 2014, President Benigno Aquino III was urged by Representative Arnel Ty (LPGMA Partylist) to observe DST from November 2014 to January 2015 and March to June 2015 to prepare for a looming power crisis.
- In March 2022, the Metropolitan Manila Development Authority studied proposals to implement DST amid the heavy vehicular traffic observed in Metro Manila. The proposal only entailed changes to work hours of government agencies and not a nationwide shift.
- In March 2023, Representative Edwin Olivarez (Parañaque–1st) proposed House Bill No. 7750, or the Daylight Saving Time Act, which would allow the President to implement DST during the first half of the year to enhance productivity. Approved by the House Committee on Economic Affairs in August 2024, the measure aims to mitigate disruptions caused by climate change, such as school interruptions and reduced workforce productivity due to heavy rains and flooding.

=== Russia ===
A decree of the Russian Provisional Government introduced summer time (Russian: летнее время) in Russia on 1 July 1917, and clocks moved one hour forward. A decree of the Soviet government led to the abandonment of this system five months later: clocks moved one hour back again on 28 December.

From 1930, Decree time had the effect of imposing year-round time-zone advances in the Soviet Union.

A decision of the Council of Ministers of the USSR reintroduced summer time in the USSR (Moscow Summer Time, for example) on 1 April 1981, and its practice continued into post-Soviet times until 2011. The changeover dates in Russia were the same as for other European countries, but clocks were moved forward or back at 02:00 local time in all zones. Thus in Moscow (local time = UTC+03:00 in winter, UTC+04:00 in summer), summer time commenced at 02:00 UTC on the day before the last Sunday in March, and ended at 03:00 UTC on the day before the last Sunday in October. (Note that "day before the last Sunday" is not the same as "the last Saturday" in a month where the last day is a Saturday.)

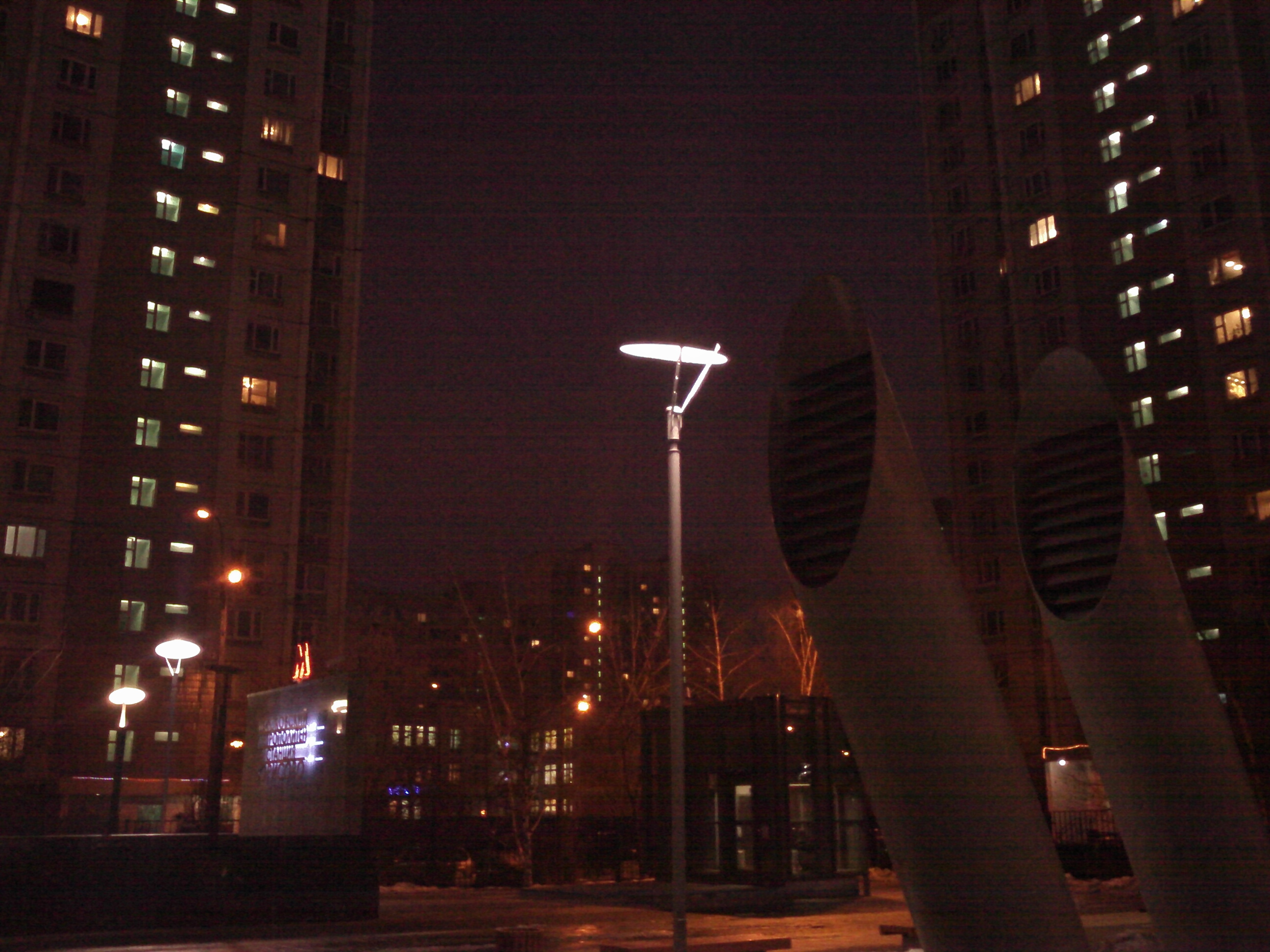
Night black sky at 9:06 am (UTC+04:00) on 23 December 2013 in Moscow

On 8 February 2011, Russian President Dmitry Medvedev announced cancellation of biannual clock changes in Russia in favor of a permanent switch to summer time. An hour was added in March 2011 for the last time, and clocks did not move back again. At the same time some of Russia's time zones were consolidated. After this reform many Russian cities had a "standard time" two hours more than would be suggested by their "astronomical time" (because the original standard time was already ahead of astronomical time in many areas).

During his 2012 election campaign, Vladimir Putin proposed re-introducing summer time, as some workers had complained about not seeing any daylight during the winter, since the sun had not risen when they went to work. According to a report in the International Herald Tribune, Russian citizens remembered the winter of 2011-12 as the "darkest winter on record" as a result of the time change. However, Putin later said it would be up to then Prime Minister Medvedev's cabinet to decide how to proceed with a seasonal time shift, and it decided to stay with the 2011 policy.

On 26 October 2014, Russia permanently returned to "winter" time.

=== South Korea ===
South Korea observed DST from 1948–51, from 1955–60, and in 1988. South Korea does not currently observe DST.

=== Syria ===
Syria observed DST in 1986–2022. Since 2012, DST was observed from the last Friday of March to the last Friday of October; however, the days of time switches varied year-to-year between 1986–2011. On 4 October 2022, Syria abolished DST, while changing the country's time zone to what used to be summer time (UTC+03:00), effectively scrapping winter time.

=== Taiwan ===
Taiwan implemented DST from 1945–61, revoked DST from 1962–73, reinstated DST from 1974–75, revoked DST from 1976–79 and reinstated it in 1980. Taiwan abandoned DST from 1981 onwards.

=== Turkey ===
Turkey is currently observing year-round daylight saving from September 2016. DST was used from 1985–2016.

In 2008, the Turkish Ministry of Energy proposed that Turkey should abolish summer time while at the same time switching to UTC+02:30, originally from 2009 onwards, but when this appeared infeasible, to start in 2011, the plan has not been heard of since.

For the year 2011, Turkey switched to European Summer Time at 3:00 am (03:00) on Monday 28 March, one day later than the rest of Europe, to avoid disrupting the national university entrance examinations held on 27 March.

Once again, for the year 2014, Turkey switched to European Summer Time at 3:00 am (03:00) on Monday 31 March, one day later than the rest of Europe, to avoid disrupting the local elections held on 30 March.

In 2015, Turkey delayed the switch from European Summer Time by 2 weeks, to 4:00 am (04:00) on Sunday 8 November, two weeks later than the rest of Europe, due to the calling of a snap general election on Sunday, 1 November.

In 2016, Turkey scrapped winter time, by switching to New Turkey Time. This means permanent UTC+03:00, which was used during summer time in Turkey. The switch was on 12:00 am (00:00) on Thursday 8 September, in reality stopping switches between summer and winter time.

== Asian countries and regions not using DST ==
These countries or regions do not use daylight saving time, although some have in the past:

1. Afghanistan
2. Armenia (Observed DST in 1981–1995, 1997–2011)
3. Azerbaijan (Observed DST in 1981–1989, 1990–1992 and 1996–2015)
4. Bahrain
5. Bangladesh (Observed DST in 1942–1945 and 2009–10)
6. Brunei
7. Cambodia
8. China (Observed DST in 1986–1992)
9. East Timor
10. India (Observed DST in 1942–1945 during World War II)
11. Indonesia (Observed various DST offsets in 1924–1963)
12. Iran (Observed DST in 1977–1980, 1991–2005 and 2008–2022)
13. Iraq (Observed DST in 1982–2007)
14. Japan (Observed DST in 1948–1951)
15. Jordan (Observed DST in 1985–2022)
16. Kazakhstan (Observed DST in 1981–1990 and 1992–2004)
17. Kuwait
18. Kyrgyzstan (Observed DST in 1981–2005)
19. Laos
20. Malaysia (Observed DST in 1933–1981)
21. Maldives
22. Mongolia (Observed DST in 1983–1989; 1990–1998; 2001–2006 and 2015–2017)
23. Myanmar
24. Nepal
25. North Korea
26. Oman
27. Pakistan (Observed DST in 1942–1945, 2002 and 2008–2009)
28. Philippines (Observed DST in 1936–1937, 1954, 1978 and 1990)
29. Qatar
30. Russia (Observed DST in 1917–1919 and 1921 (some areas), 1981–2010. 2011–2014, used year-round DST. In 2014, Russia discontinued year-round DST and switched back to standard time)
31. Saudi Arabia
32. Singapore (Observed DST in 1933–1935 by adding 20 minutes to standard time. On January 1, 1936, country changed their time zone to UTC+07:20 which was used till midnight of September 1, 1941 when it was standardized to UTC+07:30. In 1981, Malaysia decided to standardise the time across its territories to a uniform UTC+08:00, and Singapore elected to follow suit. Singapore moved half an hour forward, on 31 December 1981 at 11:30 pm, creating "Singapore Standard Time" (SST). SST is 8 hours ahead of UTC.
33. South Korea (Observed DST in 1948–1951, 1955–1960 and 1987–1988)
34. Sri Lanka
35. Syria (Observed DST in 1986–2022)
36. Taiwan (Observed DST in 1945–1962, 1974, 1975 and 1979)
37. Tajikistan (Observed DST in 1981–1991)
38. Thailand
39. Turkey (observed DST from 1985–2016)
40. Turkmenistan (Observed DST in 1981–1991)
41. United Arab Emirates
42. Uzbekistan (Observed DST in 1981–1991)
43. Vietnam
44. Yemen
