= Year 2007 problem =

Timekeeping issue in some countries

The year 2007 problem, also known as Y2K7 (or DST07), was an issue caused by the U.S. Energy Policy Act of 2005, which changed the dates for daylight saving time in the United States, and other national or regional legislation. The change had repercussions in the computer industry. Starting in 2007, daylight saving time in many jurisdictions of the United States and Canada began earlier each year and ran later each fall than in previous years; in 2007, for instance, it started on the second Sunday in March and ended on the first Sunday in November. Preparations in advance of the change prevented major disruptions or incidents, though some isolated glitches were reported affecting, among others, Google AdWords and Microsoft Windows users.

== Preparation efforts ==
The legislation regarding daylight saving time had been stable for two decades, so many computers were not designed to be able to handle the change. The year 2007 problem required updating many computer systems and applications, particularly those relying on time stamping such as scheduling software, e-mail and calendar programs, and automated back-up routines. Preparations required a significant effort by developers and corporate information technologists. Any device that automatically corrected its clock to match the time changes to daylight saving time, such as personal computers and VCRs, needed to be updated so that the device would know of the new rules. Complex networks which combined older and newer equipment often required manual intervention and required engineers to study how differing computing applications process time.

== Problems and anticipated impacts ==
If the devices weren't updated, they would show an incorrect time for three weeks in March and one week in November, causing a number of problems, including e-mails with wrong timestamps; events in calendaring software used on PDAs and other computers being displayed incorrectly, set for the wrong time, or syncing between devices that are aware of the changes in DST and those that aren't (e.g. between an updated BlackBerry or Palm device and a computer either of which required their own updates); and some authentication software, such as Kerberos in Mac OS X, not behaving properly. To avoid these problems, users either had to correct their devices manually for daylight saving time changes or apply vendor-supplied updates.

=== Medical equipment ===
It had been warned that the changes could cause some medical devices and hospital equipment to generate adverse events which could harm patients and would not be obvious to clinicians responsible for care. The U.S. Food and Drug Administration (FDA) published a preliminary public health notification on the subject.

== Countries affected ==
Implications of the changes in daylight saving time extended beyond the United States as neighbouring countries had to decide if they would change their DST rules to remain in step with the United States.

Areas changed in 2007

- United States (Not observed in Hawaii, American Samoa, Guam, Puerto Rico, the Virgin Islands and the state of Arizona [except the Navajo Nation, which observes daylight saving time due to its large size and location in three states.]) Note especially that most of the state of Indiana did not observe daylight saving time until 2006, when most of the state adopted Eastern Standard Time.
- Canada (except most of Saskatchewan, and a few isolated areas; also, Newfoundland switches at 00:01 rather than 02:00 local time)
- Cuba (switched at 00:00 local time)
- New Zealand extended daylight saving time starting in the last Sunday in September (instead of the first Sunday in October)
- Argentina introduced daylight saving time in 2007 for most but not all of the country.

== See also ==
- Daylight saving time
- Time in the United States
- System time
