= Government ministries of Samoa =

Samoa has 15 government ministries, each of which is a department of the government. Each ministry is governed by a respective minister and has a Head of Department (CEO). The Prime Minister has the power to reassign and revoke ministers assignments to ministries.

== History ==
Ministerial and Departmental Arrangements 2003 was a public sector reform, condensing 27 government departments into 14 ministries.

== Ministries ==
- Ministry of Agriculture and Fisheries (MAF)
- Ministry of Commerce, Industry and Labour (MCIL)
- Ministry of Communication and Information Technology (MCIT)
- Ministry of Education, Sports and Culture (MESC)
- Ministry of Finance (MOF)
- Ministry of Foreign Affairs and Trade (MFAT)
- Ministry of Health. Established by the Ministry of Health Act 2006.
- Ministry of Justice, and Courts Administration (MJCA)
- Ministry of Natural Resources and Environment (MNRE
- Ministry of Police (MOP)
- Ministry of the Prime Minister and Cabinet (MPMC)
- Ministry for Public Enterprises (MPE). The Ministry for Public Enterprises was originally part of the Ministry of Finance. It was announced in April 2014 with the intention of overseeing the administration of state-owned enterprises. It is not established under any specific legislation, and was created as a ministry by a 2014 amendment to the MDAA act.. Divisions include: Public Bodies Governance Division, Commercial Entities Monitoring Division, Mutual and Beneficial Monitoring Division, Public Private Partnership and Privatization Division, Corporate Services Division
- Ministry for Revenue (MFR)
- Ministry of Women, Community and Social Development (MWCSD). Established as the Ministry of Women Affairs by Ministry of Women Affairs Act 1990.
- Ministry of Works, Transport and Infrastructure (MWTI). The Ministry of Transport was established by the Ministry of Transport Act 1978. The Ministry of Works was established by the Ministry of Works Act 2002.

== See also ==
- Cabinet of Samoa
