= Daylight saving time in the Americas =

Daylight saving time in the Americas is the arrangement in the Americas by which clocks are advanced by one hour in spring and moved back in autumn, to make the most of seasonal daylight. The practice is widespread in North America, with most of Canada and the United States participating, but much less so in Central and South America.

== North America ==
=== Canada ===
Daylight saving time is observed in every one of the thirteen provinces and territories of Canada, either just in the summer months or permanently year-round.

Since 2007, the semi-annual clock change for summer time daylight saving time begins on the second Sunday of March and ends on the first Sunday of November.

Several provinces and territories have gone to permanent DST. British Columbia and Yukon use Mountain Standard Time. Alberta, Saskatchewan, and the Northwest Territories use Central Standard Time. Manitoba uses Eastern Standard Time.

=== United States ===
Since 2007, daylight saving time begins on the second Sunday of March and ends on the first Sunday of November.

The states of Hawaii and Arizona do not observe daylight saving time. Hawaii stays on Hawaiian Standard time year round, Arizona stays on Mountain Standard time year round except for the Navajo Nation which observes Mountain Daylight Time (MDT).

The US territories of Puerto Rico and the US Virgin Islands remain on Atlantic Standard Time (AST) all year long, so clocks in those territories match those in New York City during the summer and Bermuda in the winter.

On March 15, 2022, the United States Senate passed the Sunshine Protection Act by unanimous consent. If passed by the House of Representatives, the law would place the United States under Daylight Time year-round.

=== Mexico ===
Mexico observed daylight saving time (DST; Spanish: horario de verano) nationwide from 1996 to 2022, even in its tropical regions, because of its increasing economic ties to the United States. It previously observed the schedule used by the United States prior to 2007, with DST beginning on the first Sunday of April and ending on the last Sunday of October. Although the United States changed the schedule for DST beginning in 2007, only certain municipalities in Mexico, located less than 20 km from the border adopted this change. The rest of the country continued to follow the original schedule before abolishing DST on Sunday, 30 October 2022. The border municipalities that changed to observe the U.S. schedule continue to do so, beginning DST on the second Sunday of March and ending it on the first Sunday of November.

=== Saint Pierre and Miquelon ===
Saint Pierre and Miquelon, located near the Canadian coast, belongs to France, but observes daylight saving time according to Canadian rules.

=== Greenland ===
Greenland (excluding two minor areas at Danmarkshavn and Pituffik) observes DST and uses the European convention (DST begins 01:00 UTC last Sunday in March and ends 01:00 UTC last Sunday in October). Most populated places in the country are in the UTC−02:00 zone in the winter (UTC−01:00 in the summer). Clocks are changed from 23:00 to 24:00 in the spring (on the Saturday before the last Sunday in March), and reset back from 24:00 to 23:00 in the autumn (on the Saturday before the last Sunday in October).

Danmarkshavn does not use DST, because it is a weather station with an airstrip which is supplied from Iceland, which does not use DST. This might apply to some other weather stations in the area.

Pituffik/Thule Air Base uses UTC−04:00 and United States conventions on DST because it is a US air base, meaning it is part of the Atlantic Time Zone.

=== Bermuda ===
Bermuda has observed DST annually since 1974.

=== The Caribbean islands ===
==== Bahamas ====
The Commonwealth of The Bahamas observes DST according to the American schedule.

==== Barbados ====
Barbados in the western Atlantic no longer observes Daylight Saving Time, like many Caribbean nations. The last observance of a daylight saving-related time clock adjustment was between Sunday, 20 April 1980 at 02:00 and Thursday, 25 September 1980 at 02:00. On 25 September the clock was shifted from -3:00 to -4:00, where it has remained since.

==== Cuba ====
Cuba normally observes DST from March to October although the precise dates vary. For two years in the mid-2000s, Cuba stayed on DST throughout the year. In 2009 it was on DST from the second Sunday in March to the last Sunday of October. In 2011, it was on DST from the second Sunday in March to the first Sunday in November. Cuba continued following the changes in the U.S. and Canada until 2026. In October 2026, it was announced that Cuba would not revert to standard time that November.

==== Dominica ====
Dominica in the Caribbean does not observe Daylight Saving Time, like several other Caribbean nations.

==== Dutch Caribbean Islands ====
The Dutch Caribbean islands of Aruba, Bonaire, Curaçao, Saba, Sint Eustatius and Sint Maarten do not observe Daylight Saving Time.

==== French Caribbean Islands ====
The French Caribbean islands of Guadeloupe, Martinique, Saint-Barthélemy and Saint-Martin do not observe Daylight Saving Time.

==== Haiti ====
Haiti had reestablished Daylight Saving Time in 2012, following the US/Canada DST Rules, starting on the second Sunday in March and ending on the first Sunday in November. This was discontinued in 2016, but was re-introduced in 2017.

==== Jamaica ====
Jamaica previously used Daylight Saving Time, utilising the US and Canadian rules. The practice was followed from 1974 before being discontinued in 1983.

==== Puerto Rico ====
Puerto Rico remains all year long in Atlantic Standard Time. (AST).

==== Trinidad and Tobago ====
Trinidad and Tobago remains on Atlantic Standard Time and does not observe DST.

==== Turks and Caicos Islands ====
Turks and Caicos discontinued Daylight Saving Time in March 2015, at the same time moving from the Eastern Time Zone to the Atlantic Time Zone, the result being the same as having year-round Daylight Saving in the Eastern Time Zone. In 2018, the islands reintroduced daylight saving time by setting the clocks back 1 hour to Eastern Standard Time; the islands follow the same daylight saving schedule as the United States and Canada.

=== Central America ===
==== Guatemala ====
Guatemala has used DST during energy crises. The last time the country used DST was from 30 April to 1 October 2006.

==== Honduras ====
Honduras adopted DST from May 1994 until September 1994 but then abandoned it. On 7 May 2006 it again used DST; however the country ended DST observance on 7 August 2006, making this the shortest use of DST in the northern hemisphere as it was only applied for 3 months. The government decided not to use DST in 2007.

==== Nicaragua ====
Nicaragua observed DST from 1 January 1992 until 20 February 1994 but it stopped thereafter. DST was re-implemented, citing energy conservation, beginning 10 April 2005 until 2 October 2005 and followed a similar period the next year. 2006's observance of DST began on 30 April and ended on 1 October. In 2007, the government of Nicaragua decided to stop observing daylight saving time.

== South America ==
In equatorial regions, DST is not useful because of the stability of light levels throughout the year. As a result, large areas of South America do not observe DST. As of 2026, only Chile uses daylight saving time.

=== Argentina ===
Since 2009, Argentina has not been observing DST and the entire country has stayed on UTC−03:00. Argentina is located at a longitude that would naturally put it in the UTC−04:00 or UTC−05:00 time zone.

San Luis province, which was previously in a different time zone than most of the country and which formerly observed DST, decided in April 2010 not to change its clocks back and to stay on UTC−03:00 all year round.

The most recent history of Argentina observing DST dates from 2007 to 2009. After a period of not observing DST, Argentina observed DST in some provinces in an attempt to save energy. For each period, the executive branch of the government set the specific start and end dates for DST, i.e. there was no fixed annual schedule.

=== Bolivia ===
In 2011, Bolivia planned to observe DST starting September 1 for the first time in its history, advancing the clock an hour on a nationwide basis in order to offset their energy problems. The schedule change was planned to take place every year between September and March, corresponding to the spring and summer of the South American country. However, the day before the scheduled change, on August 31, 2011, the national government indefinitely suspended the observation of DST due to opposition from experts in electricity, neighborhood and school leaders, and the general populace.

=== Brazil ===
Brazil adopted DST (called horário de verão—"summer time"—in Portuguese) for the first time in 1931, and it was in effect across the entire country. The duration and regional applicability of DST has varied over the years (see Portuguese Wikipedia page for details). As of 2013, DST was used only in the southern region (the states of Rio Grande do Sul, Santa Catarina, Paraná), the southeast region (the states of São Paulo, Rio de Janeiro, Espírito Santo, Minas Gerais), and the central-west region (the state of Goiás and the Distrito Federal, and the states of Mato Grosso and Mato Grosso do Sul).

Formerly, starting and ending dates were variable, but in 2008, a decree (No. 6558 of 9 September 2008) established a permanent rule: DST starts at 00:00 on the third Sunday in October from 2008 to 2017 (and on the first Sunday in November from 2018 to the present), and ends at 00:00 on the third Sunday in February—unless the latter falls during Carnaval: in this case, the end of DST was postponed by one week.

In 2019, Brazil scrapped daylight saving time and now stays on standard time year round.

=== Chile ===
Chile currently observes DST from the Sunday after the first Saturday in September to the Sunday after the first Saturday in April.

In the past, DST was observed from the second Saturday in October to the second Saturday in March, but it has varied (see Time in Chile). In 2008, for example, the time was adjusted on Sunday, March 30, at 12 midnight. In 2010, because of an earthquake, DST remained in effect until April 3. In 2011, in order to prevent energy shortages after a dry summer, DST was first extended until April 2 and then until May 7. From 2011 to 2014, Chile DST started the first Saturday of September at 24:00, and ended the last Saturday of April at 24:00.

DST was not observed in 2015 when the government declared that the country would remain on UTC-03:00 permanently. But on March 16, 2016, decree 253 modified the 2015 decision and restored winter time, except for the Magallanes and Chilean Antarctica Region which remains on UTC-03:00 permanently. It would last 90 days from the second weekend of May to the second weekend of August.

=== Colombia ===
From February 1992 until March 1993, Colombia suffered rolling blackouts of up to 10 hours a day due to a particularly strong El Niño season, which dried the reservoirs in hydroelectric plants in a country deriving 70% of its energy output from hydroelectric sources; consequently, the government decided to use DST to help save electricity. The experiment failed to deliver the intended results, possibly due to Colombia's low latitude, and the DST experiment was discontinued.

It is possible that Columbia will experience DST again in the second half of 2026, due to a strong El Niño and a potential energy crisis that could lead to a blackout by the end of the year.

=== Ecuador ===
Ecuador's President Sixto Durán Ballén imposed daylight saving time in 1992 in an energy-saving effort. It was poorly received by the populace and did not last long.

=== Falkland Islands ===
DST (UTC−03:00) is generally observed from the first Sunday of September to the third Sunday of April. However, the Falklands remained on DST throughout 2011 and 2012.

=== Paraguay ===
Paraguay observes DST under decree 1867 of March 5, 2004. DST ends on the second Sunday of March and starts on the third Sunday of October.

In 2007, DST started on October 15, 2006, and ended on March 11, 2007.

In 2010, Paraguay changed its DST rules because of the energy crisis, ending DST on the second Sunday in April, a month later than previous years. The start date remains unchanged.

In 2024, a law proposal that would see DST being scrapped in its entirety and UTC−03:00 becoming the country's official time zone was approved by both chambers of the Congress. It has been announced by the President Santiago Peña that the law would be approved in a few days.

=== Uruguay ===
Beginning in 2004, Uruguay began to observe DST. Starting in 2006, DST began on the first Sunday in October and ended on the second Sunday in March of each year. However, on 30 June 2015, Uruguay abolished DST.
