= Daylight saving time in Oceania =

New Zealand and parts of Australia are areas of Oceania that currently observe daylight saving time (DST).

== By country and region ==
=== Australia ===
Present situation

Currently, New South Wales, Victoria, Tasmania, the Australian Capital Territory, the Jervis Bay Territory and South Australia apply DST each year, from the first Sunday in October to the first Sunday in April. The Northern Territory, Queensland, Western Australia and the external territories do not observe DST.

History

Daylight saving was first used in Australia during World War I, and was applied in all states. It was used again during the Second World War. A drought in Tasmania in 1967 led to the reintroduction during the summer, and this was repeated every summer since. In 1971, New South Wales, Victoria, Queensland, South Australia, and the Australian Capital Territory followed Tasmania in observing daylight saving, Western Australia and the Northern Territory did not. Queensland abandoned daylight saving time in 1972. Originally Tasmania alone commenced daylight saving on the first Sunday in October, while the other states began on the last Sunday in October and finished on the last Sunday in March, until 2008 excepting in 2000 when all the states observing DST moved forward the commencement date to Sunday, 27 August 2000 because of the Sydney Olympic Games which commenced in mid-September. From 2008/09 daylight saving has been extended another four weeks in NSW, Victoria, SA and the ACT, in addition to Tasmania, from the first Sunday in October to the first Sunday in April.

Queensland again trialled daylight saving, for three years between 1989 and 1992, with a referendum on daylight saving held on 22 February 1992, which was defeated with a 54.5% ‘no’ vote - with regional and rural areas strongly opposed, while those in the metropolitan South East Queensland were in favour.

In December 2008, the Daylight Saving for South East Queensland (DS4SEQ) political party was officially registered, advocating the implementation of a dual-time zone arrangement for Daylight Saving in South East Queensland while the rest of the state maintains standard time. The party contested the March 2009 Queensland State election with 32 candidates and received around one percent of the state-wide primary vote, equating to around 2.5% across the 32 electorates contested.

On 14 April 2010, and after being approached by the Daylight Saving for South East Queensland (DS4SEQ) political party, Queensland Independent member Peter Wellington, introduced the Daylight Saving for South East Queensland Referendum Bill 2010 into Queensland Parliament, calling for a referendum to be held at the next State election on the introduction of daylight saving into South East Queensland under a dual-time zone arrangement. The Bill was defeated in Queensland Parliament on 15 June 2011.

In Western Australia, four referendums in 1975, 1984, 1992 and 2009 have rejected DST. In 2006, the Parliament of Western Australia approved a three-year daylight saving trial to be followed by a referendum to decide whether DST should be put in place permanently. However, public opposition mounted during the first year of the trial, and the WA Nationals announced a public campaign to bring the referendum forward to 2007. The trial continued until the referendum, held on 16 May 2009. The result was another rejection of DST, by a larger margin compared to the three previous referendums. Although as previously the suburbs of the state capital, Perth, supported the proposal, it was by a much narrower margin than before with significant swings against it in several areas, most notably in the East Metropolitan region. As a result, the Premier of Western Australia has said that the DST issue should not be considered for at least another 20 years.

The Northern Territory experimented with daylight saving in the early part of the 20th century. It was last used in 1944.

=== Fiji ===
Despite its proximity to the equator and therefore a relatively small variation of daylight length, Fiji implemented daylight saving time in 1998-99 but it ended after that. Fiji restarted DST in 2009 starting on November 29 and ending on April 26, 2010. The decision was based on a report by the Attorney-General, Mr Aiyaz Sayed-Khaiyum. "Mr Sayed-Khaiyum said that from the information available, the implementation of daylight saving in 1998 and 1999 received very encouraging response from the people and the business community. Apart from availability of more daylight time for sport, leisure and shopping, the working people are able to spend quality daylight time in the afternoons and evenings with their family and loved ones, including engaging in healthy activities such as gardening or going for a walk. In 1999, the Ministry of Labour reported that there was an overall increase in economic activity and productive work as a result of daylight saving." For the 2010-2011 summer, DST started on fourth Sunday in October and ended on last Sunday in March. Fiji changed the ending of DST to the last Sunday in January in 2011. In 2021 the Fiji government announced that Fiji would not observe daylight saving time in 2021–22.

=== Hawaii ===
Although Hawaii is further away from equator than Fiji, and therefore there is a slightly greater variation in the daylight length, Hawaii does not observe DST. Most of the inhabited islands are located close to the west end of the Hawaii–Aleutian Time Zone, and Oahu, Kauai and Niihau are located more than 7 degrees west of the Hawaii–Aleutian Time Zone's meridian and should, theoretically, be located in the next time zone to the west. Therefore, advancing the clock in Hawaii would make sunrise times close to 7:00 a.m. even in June.

Hawaii did experiment with DST for three weeks between April 30, 1933, and May 21, 1933; there are no known official records as to why it was implemented or discontinued. Hawaii has never observed daylight saving time under the Uniform Time Act, having opted out of the Act's provisions in 1967.

=== New Zealand ===
From 30 April 2007, DST begins at 02:00 NZST on the last Sunday in September each year, and ends at 03:00 NZDT (or 02:00 NZST as defined in the Time Act 1974) on the first Sunday in April.

New Zealand time, including DST, is used by several Antarctic bases that are supplied from New Zealand. This results in the oddity that the Amundsen-Scott South Pole Station sets its clocks an hour further ahead during the southern summer, when the sun is constantly above the horizon, than in the southern winter, when the sun is constantly below the horizon. The extreme geographic position of the base means that no possible adjustment of the daily activity cycle can have any effect on the amount of sunlight received during those activities. However, the arrangement presumably makes real time communications with New Zealand more practical, particularly in dealing with offices.

The New Zealand dependencies of Tokelau, Cook Islands and Niue do not maintain DST. The latter two are on the other side of the International Date Line and differ between 22 and 24 hours from New Zealand proper.

=== Samoa ===
Samoa observed DST from 2010 to 2021, starting on the last Sunday in September and ending on first Sunday in April.

=== U.S. territories ===
All U.S. insular territories with civilian government in Oceania, American Samoa, Guam, and the Northern Mariana Islands lie in the tropics and do not observe DST.
