= UTC+07:20 =

Former time zone

- Time zone

UTC offset
- UTC: UTC+07:20

Current time
- 01:19, 26 March 2025 UTC+07:20 [refresh]

Central meridian

Date-time group

UTC+07:20 is an identifier for a time offset from UTC of +07:20.

== History ==
UTC+07:20 was used as daylight saving time in Malaya and Singapore between 1933 and 1941. On midnight January 1, 1933, people in Malaya and Singapore switched from UTC+07:00 to UTC+07:20 when clocks were turned forward 20 minutes. This time was used until midnight of September 1, 1941 when UTC+07:30 started to be used.

== See also ==
- Singapore Standard Time
- Time in Malaysia
- UTC+07:30
