= Time in Angola =

Time in Africa: Light Blue / Cape Verde Time^{[a]} (UTC−1); Blue / Greenwich Mean Time (UTC); Red / Central European Time; West Africa Time; (UTC+1)^{[b]}; Yellow / Central Africa Time; Eastern European Time; South African Standard Time; (UTC+2); Ochre / Egypt Standard Time (UTC+2); Ochre / Egypt Summer Time (UTC+3); Green / East Africa Time (UTC+3); Turquoise / Mauritius Time^{[d]}; Seychelles Time^{[d]}; (UTC+4)^{a} The islands of Cape Verde lie west of the African mainland.^{b} During Ramadan, Morocco switches to Greenwich Mean Time (UTC) and returns to UTC+1 after it ends.^{d} Mauritius and the Seychelles lie to the east and northeast of Madagascar, respectively.

All of Angola uses UTC+01:00 (West Africa Time), and has never observed Daylight saving time.

== TZ database ==
c.c.	Coordinates	Timezone name	Comments	UTC offset (Std.)	UTC offset (DST)
AO	−0848+01314	Africa/Luanda		+01:00	—N/a
