= Time in Morocco =

Time in Africa: Light Blue / Cape Verde Time^{[a]} (UTC−1); Blue / Greenwich Mean Time (UTC); Red / Central European Time; West Africa Time; (UTC+1); Yellow / Central Africa Time; Eastern European Time; South African Standard Time; (UTC+2); Ochre / Egypt Standard Time (UTC+2); Ochre / Egypt Summer Time (UTC+3); Green / East Africa Time (UTC+3); Turquoise / Mauritius Time^{[b]}; Seychelles Time^{[b]}; (UTC+4)^{a} The islands of Cape Verde are west of the African mainland.^{b} Mauritius and the Seychelles are east and northeast of Madagascar, respectively.

From 20 September 2026, Morocco observes the standard time of UTC+00:00 permanently. Between 2018 and 2026, daylight saving time (DST, UTC+01:00) was permanently observed. Previously, time was advanced to UTC+01:00 at 02:00 on the last Sunday of March, and reverted to UTC+00:00 (standard time), defined as Greenwich Mean Time locally, at 03:00 on the last Sunday of October. This practice was continued until October 2018, after which clocks were permanently advanced. An exception was made during the month of Ramadan during which clocks reverted to UTC+00:00 (standard time).

== History ==
- 2008: DST began on 1 June and ended on 1 September. This was the first time Morocco had used daylight saving time since 1978.
- 2009: DST began on 1 June and ended on 21 August.
- 2010: DST began on 2 May and ended on 8 August, just before Ramadan, as had been the case in recent years.
- 2011: DST began on 2 April at midnight and ended on 31 July at midnight.
- 2012: On 8 March 2012, the Moroccan Cabinet approved a bill for the permanent adoption of DST with predictable start and finish dates. However, before the start of DST, they changed it to advance to UTC+01:00 at 02:00 on the last Sunday of April, and return to UTC at 03:00 on the last Sunday of September, with the exception of the holy month of Ramadan, during which DST will not be observed. As a result, the time changes in 2012 were:
  - 29 April – advance to UTC+01:00 (DST)
  - 20 July – return to UTC+00:00 (start of Ramadan)
  - 20 August – advance to UTC+01:00 (end of Ramadan)
  - 30 September – return to UTC+00:00 (standard time)
- 2013: DST followed the 2012 law at first:
  - 28 April – advance to UTC+01:00 (DST)
  - 7 July – return to UTC+00:00 (start of Ramadan)
  - 10 August – advance to UTC+01:00 (end of Ramadan)
  - 28 September – The government announced a change in policy, which moved the end of DST from the last Sunday in September (which was to be the next day) to the last Sunday in October (27 October). At the same time, they moved the beginning of DST back to the last Sunday in March (next 30 March 2014). As usual, advancements to DST (UTC+01:00) occurred at 02:00 and returns to standard time (UTC+00:00) occurred at 03:00.
- 2014: these dates were:
  - 30 March – advance to UTC+01:00 (DST)
  - 28 June – return to UTC+00:00 (start of Ramadan)
  - 2 August – advance to UTC+01:00 (end of Ramadan)
  - 26 October – return to UTC+00:00 (standard time)
- 2018: Switch to permanent DST: On 26 October, a government decree mandated permanent daylight saving time, setting the UTC offset to UTC+01:00 all year round except during Ramadan.
- 2026: Switch to permanent standard time of UTC+00:00: Citing citizens' complaints of dark mornings, poor health, and public danger, the government reversed its decreed permanent DST and returned the country to permanent standard time. This also eliminates the regular schedule of turning the clock back one hour during Ramadan.

== IANA time zone database ==
The IANA time zone database contains one zone for Morocco in the file zone.tab.

c.c.	Coordinates	Timezone name	Comments	UTC offset
MA	+3339−00735	Africa/Casablanca		+00:00
