= Daylight saving time in Africa =

Time in Africa: Light Blue / Cape Verde Time^{[a]} (UTC−1); Blue / Greenwich Mean Time (UTC); Red / Central European Time; West Africa Time; (UTC+1); Yellow / Central Africa Time; Eastern European Time; South African Standard Time; (UTC+2); Ochre / Egypt Standard Time (UTC+2); Ochre / Egypt Summer Time (UTC+3); Green / East Africa Time (UTC+3); Turquoise / Mauritius Time^{[b]}; Seychelles Time^{[b]}; (UTC+4)^{a} The islands of Cape Verde are west of the African mainland.^{b} Mauritius and the Seychelles are east and northeast of Madagascar, respectively.

African countries, apart from Egypt, do not use daylight saving time (DST) although some did in the past. Only the territories of the Canary Islands, Ceuta and Melilla (Spain) and Madeira (Portugal) implement DST from the last Sunday in March to the last Sunday in October. Although these regions politically belong to Europe, they are geographically part of Africa. They have DST schedules according to European Union rules.

== African countries that use DST ==
=== Egypt ===
The British first instituted daylight saving time in Egypt during the Second World War, specifically between 1940 and 1945. The practice was stopped after the war, but resumed 12 years later, in 1957.

Egypt normally observed daylight saving time between the last Friday in April and the last Thursday in September when the clocks were three hours ahead of Greenwich Mean Time (UTC+3). The change occurred one second after 23:59:59 on Thursday to become 1:00:00 on the last Friday in April shortening the day to 23 hours. Summer time ended one second after 23:59:59 to become 23:00:00 on the last Thursday of September lengthening the day to 25 hours. The date did not change one second after the first 23:59:59 occurred; for all practical purposes, midnight did not occur until after the second 23:59:59. An exception was made for Ramadan; in 2006 the end of DST took place one week earlier, on 21 September 2006, which took place before the start of the holy month of Ramadan. The same practice recurred in 2007 and 2008, to avoid having longer days in Ramadan. In 2009, summer time ended on Thursday, 20 August, five weeks before the nominal end on the last Thursday in September. In 2010, the summer time started on 30 April and ended on 30 September, but between 10 August and 10 September summer time was cancelled because of Ramadan. The previous government was planning to take a decision to abolish it in 2011 before the January 25 Revolution. The transitional government abolished daylight saving time on 20 April 2011. On May 7, 2014, the Egyptian government restored daylight saving time starting on 16 May with an exception for the holy month of Ramadan.

From 2015 onwards, Egypt no longer observes it. On April 29, 2016, the Egyptian government made plans to restore daylight saving time starting on July 7, 2016, during Eid al-Fitr, however later on July 4, 2016, the Egyptian government cancelled these plans to re-introduce DST.

In March 2023, the Egyptian government announced it would be restoring DST, starting on last Friday of April and ending on the last Thursday of October.

== African countries that used to use DST ==
=== Libya ===
Libya observed DST each year from 1982 to 1989, 1997, and 2013.

=== Morocco ===
From late 2018 onwards, daylight saving time (DST) was no longer observed in Morocco, advancing to UTC+01:00 year round, except during the month of Ramadan, when clocks were put back to UTC+00:00. However, this change was altered in September 2026, with the time reverting to UTC+00:00 permanently.

=== Namibia ===
At Independence of Namibia, the country inherited the time regulations of South Africa and was in time zone UTC+02:00 all year round.

From 1994 until 2017, Namibia used Winter time, the practice of setting clocks back during winter months by one hour. In this period Namibian Standard Time was at UTC+02:00 Central Africa Time in summer, and UTC+01:00 (West Africa Time) in winter. This change named Namibian Standard Time was introduced in 1993, triggered by fears for school children walking to school before sunrise. Winter time began on the first Sunday in April at 03:00, and lasted until the first Sunday in September, 02:00 hours. In the Zambezi Region in the far north-east of Namibia clocks were not changed and remained on Central Africa Time all year round so that during winter time, Namibia spanned two time zones.

In the 2010s repeated calls from businesses and private individuals were made to abolish winter time, citing incompatibilities with South Africa, Namibia's main trading partner, as well as a "loss of productivity". The National Council passed the Namibian Time Bill 2017 in August 2017 and repealed the 1993 act, placing Namibia back into the South African Standard Time zone of UTC+02:00.

=== Tunisia ===
Tunisia adopted daylight saving time for the first time in 2005 starting 1 May 2005 and following EU time schedules thereafter. This comes as a move by the government to promote saving of energy. In 2009 the government of Tunisia canceled DST and kept the standard time all year round.

== African countries not using DST ==
These countries or regions do not use daylight saving time, although some have in the past:

1. Algeria (Observed DST before 1981)
2. Angola
3. Benin
4. Botswana
5. Burkina Faso
6. Burundi
7. Cameroon
8. Cape Verde
9. Central African Republic
10. Chad (Observed DST 1979–80)
11. Comoros
12. Democratic Republic of the Congo
13. Republic of the Congo
14. Côte d'Ivoire
15. Djibouti
16. Equatorial Guinea
17. Eritrea
18. Eswatini (Swaziland)
19. Ethiopia
20. Gabon
21. Gambia
22. Ghana
23. Guinea
24. Guinea-Bissau
25. Kenya
26. Lesotho
27. Liberia
28. Libya
29. Madagascar
30. Malawi
31. Mali
32. Mauritania
33. Mauritius
34. Mayotte
35. Morocco
36. Mozambique
37. Namibia (Observed DST 1994–2017)
38. Niger
39. Nigeria
40. Rwanda
41. Saint Helena, Ascension and Tristan da Cunha
42. São Tomé and Príncipe
43. Senegal
44. Seychelles
45. Sierra Leone
46. Somalia
47. South Africa (Observed DST 1942–1944)
48. South Sudan
49. Sudan
50. Tanzania
51. Togo
52. Tunisia
53. Uganda
54. Western Sahara
55. Zambia
56. Zimbabwe
