= Time in Libya =

- Time zone: Eastern European Time
- Initials: EET
- UTC offset: UTC+02:00
- Adopted: 5 November 2012

Daylight saving time
- DST not observed

tz database
- Africa/Tripoli

Time in Libya is given by a single time zone, officially denoted as Eastern European Time (EET; UTC+02:00). The zone is also known as Central Africa Time (CAT). Libya has observed EET since 5 November 2012, after it was announced in 2013 that Libya would be on permanent daylight saving time. Libya previously observed several different time zones as standard time and daylight saving time. For residents of western Libya, including Tripoli, solar time is usually one hour behind standard time.

== Daylight saving time ==
Libya previously observed daylight saving time, moving one hour ahead from Central European Time (CET; UTC+01:00) to Central European Summer Time (CEST; UTC+02:00), each year from 1951 to 1956, 1982 to 1989, 1997, and 2013. Libya announced in 2013 that it would be on permanent daylight saving time.

== IANA time zone database ==
In the IANA time zone database, Libya is given one zone in the file zone.tab – Africa/Tripoli. "LY" refers to the country's ISO 3166-1 alpha-2 country code. Data for Libya directly from zone.tab of the IANA time zone database; columns marked with * are the columns from zone.tab itself:

| c.c.* | coordinates* | TZ* | Comments | UTC offset | DST |
|---|---|---|---|---|---|
| LY | +3254+01311 | Africa/Tripoli | | +02:00 | +02:00 |

== See also ==
- Daylight saving time in Africa
- List of time zones by country
- List of UTC time offsets
