= Armenia Time =

Time zone

Time in Europe: Light Blue / Western European Time / Greenwich Mean Time (UTC); Blue / Western European Time / Greenwich Mean Time (UTC); Blue / Western European Summer Time / British Summer Time / Irish Standard Time (UTC+1); Red / Central European Time (UTC+1); Red / Central European Summer Time (UTC+2); Yellow / Eastern European Time / Kaliningrad Time (UTC+2); Ochre / Eastern European Time (UTC+2); Ochre / Eastern European Summer Time (UTC+3); Green / Moscow Time / Turkey Time (UTC+3); Turquoise / Armenia Time / Azerbaijan Time / Georgia Time / Samara Time (UTC+4); ▉▉▉▉ Pale hues: Standard time observed all year ▉▉▉ Dark hues: Daylight saving time

Armenia Time (Note: Armenian: Հայաստանի ժամանակ, romanized: Hayastani zhamanak) (AMT) is a time zone used in Armenia. It is four hours ahead of UTC at UTC+04:00.

Clock time is about one hour later than solar noon in Armenia. Consequently, population activity hours are similar to those in Paris or Barcelona, which have about the same shift to solar time. They are about one hour later compared to those in Berlin and Vienna, and are two hours later than those in Warsaw and New York.

The former breakaway state of the Republic of Artsakh also used Armenia Time until its dissolution in 2023.

== Daylight saving time ==
Armenia does not use daylight saving time (DST). The Government of Armenia issued a decree that cancelled the observance of daylight saving time, otherwise known as Armenia Summer Time (AMST) in 2012.

== Other time zones in UTC +4 ==
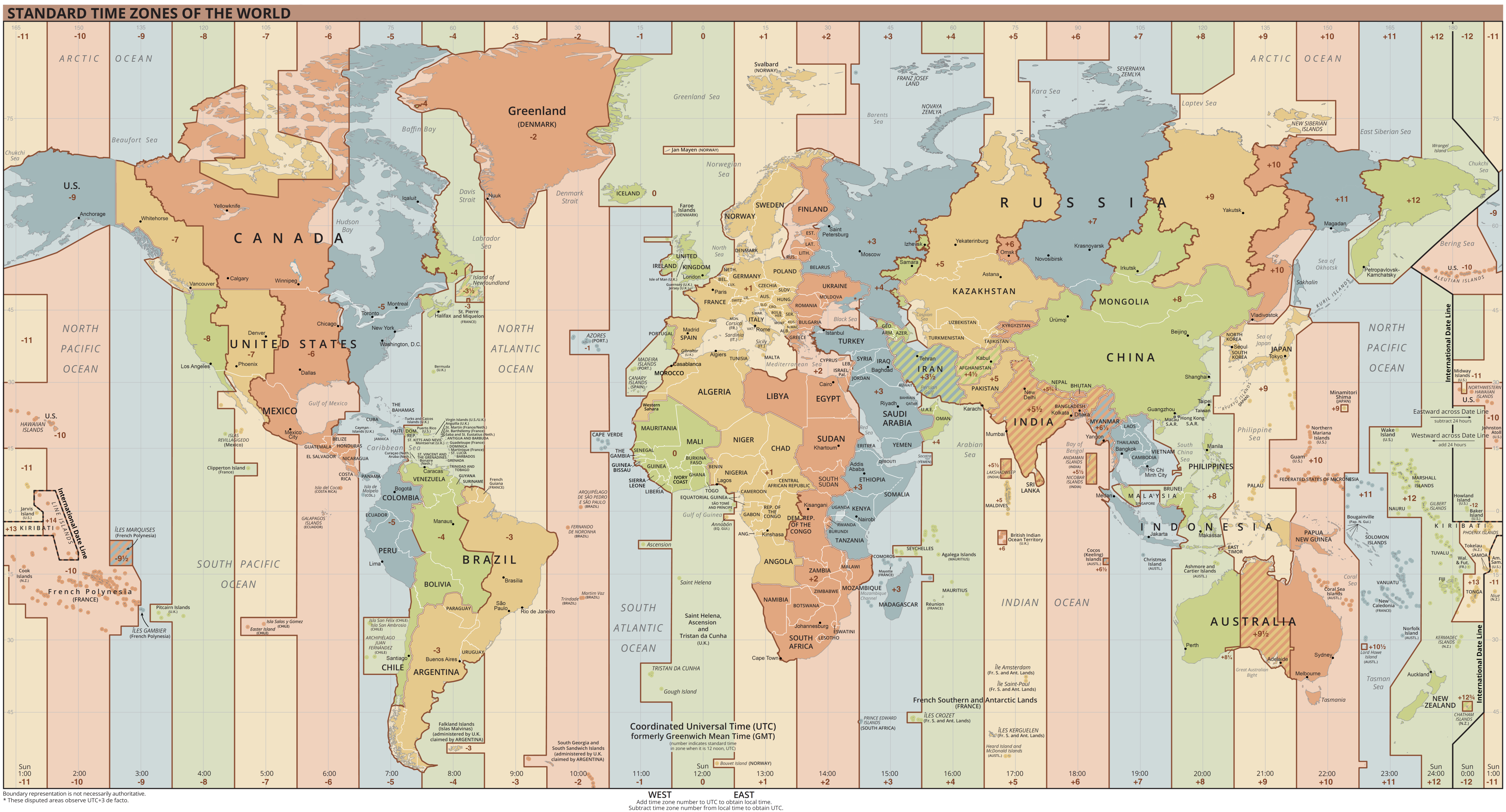
World map of current time zones

Some time zones exist that have the same offset as AMT, but can be found under a different name in other countries, these include:

- Georgia Time
- Azerbaijan Time
- Gulf Standard Time
- Mauritius Time
- United Arab Emirates Standard Time
- Réunion Time
- Samara Time
- Seychelles Time

== See also ==
- Lists of time zones
- Time in Europe
