= Daylight saving time in Egypt =

Egypt is the only sovereign African country that observes Daylight Saving Time (DST). Its current system was restored in 2023, with the first DST observance starting on 28 April 2023 at 00:00 (UTC+2:00) and ending on 26 October 2023 at 23:59 (UTC+3:00). This makes it the only African country using DST as of 2025.

== History ==
Time in Africa: Light Blue / Cape Verde Time^{[a]} (UTC−1); Blue / Greenwich Mean Time (UTC); Red / Central European Time; West Africa Time; (UTC+1); Yellow / Central Africa Time; Eastern European Time; South African Standard Time; (UTC+2); Ochre / Egypt Standard Time (UTC+2); Ochre / Egypt Summer Time (UTC+3); Green / East Africa Time (UTC+3); Turquoise / Mauritius Time^{[b]}; Seychelles Time^{[b]}; (UTC+4)^{a} The islands of Cape Verde are west of the African mainland.^{b} Mauritius and the Seychelles are east and northeast of Madagascar, respectively.

Time in the Middle East: Offset / Zone(s); UTC+2 / Eastern European Time; Israel Standard Time; Palestine Standard Time; UTC+3 / Eastern European Summer Time; Israel Summer Time; Palestine Summer Time; UTC+3 / Arabia Standard Time; Turkey Time; UTC+3:30 / Iran Standard Time; UTC+4 / Gulf Standard Time; Standard time observed all year Daylight saving time observed

The British first instituted summer time in Egypt in 1940, during the Second World War. The practice was stopped after 1945, but resumed 12 years later, in 1957.

Before the revolution in January 2011, the government was planning to take a decision to abolish summer time in 2011 before President Hosni Mubarak's term expired in September 2011. The transitional government did so on 20 April 2011.

Under the pretext that daylight saving time would save energy, the Egyptian government decided on 7 May 2014 to reinstate summer time with an exception for the holy month of Ramadan. In April the next year, a poll was held on whether to apply summer time or not. Following the results, the government decided on 20 April to temporarily cancel summer time, to make the necessary amendment to the laws and asked the ministers to work on a study to determine the probability of applying DST in coming years or not. The ministry of electricity assured that the achieved electricity savings from applying summer time is not of any tangible effect. Summer time was expected to return in 2016, starting on 8 July (after Ramadan), but on 5 July, it was decided to again cancel it.

In March 2023, the Egyptian Government announced it would be restoring DST, starting in April and ending in October.

== Dates and times ==
Egypt observes summer time between the last Friday in April and the last Thursday in October. The clocks are changed from UTC+02:00 to UTC+03:00. The change occurs one second after 23:59:59 on Thursday to become 01:00:00 on the last Friday in April shortening the day to 23 hours. Summer time ends one second after 23:59:59 to become 23:00:00 on the last Thursday of October lengthening the day to 25 hours. The date does not change one second after the first 23:59:59 occurred; for all practical purposes, midnight does not occur until after the second 23:59:59.

=== Ramadan ===
The lunar calendar used by Islam is about eleven days shorter than the solar year, so its months shift every year relative to the seasons. To avoid having longer days during the holy month of fasting, Ramadan, exceptions have been made to the DST schedule when the two overlap. Starting in 2006, the end of summer time has taken place on the Thursday before the start of Ramadan. This continued until 2010, when Ramadan was completely inside "summer". Since then, summer time has effectively been split into two periods: one before Ramadan, and one after.

== See also ==
- Summer time
- Egypt Standard Time
- UTC+02:00
- UTC+03:00
- Climate of Egypt
