= Egypt Standard Time =

Identifier for a time offset from UTC of +02:00

- Time zone
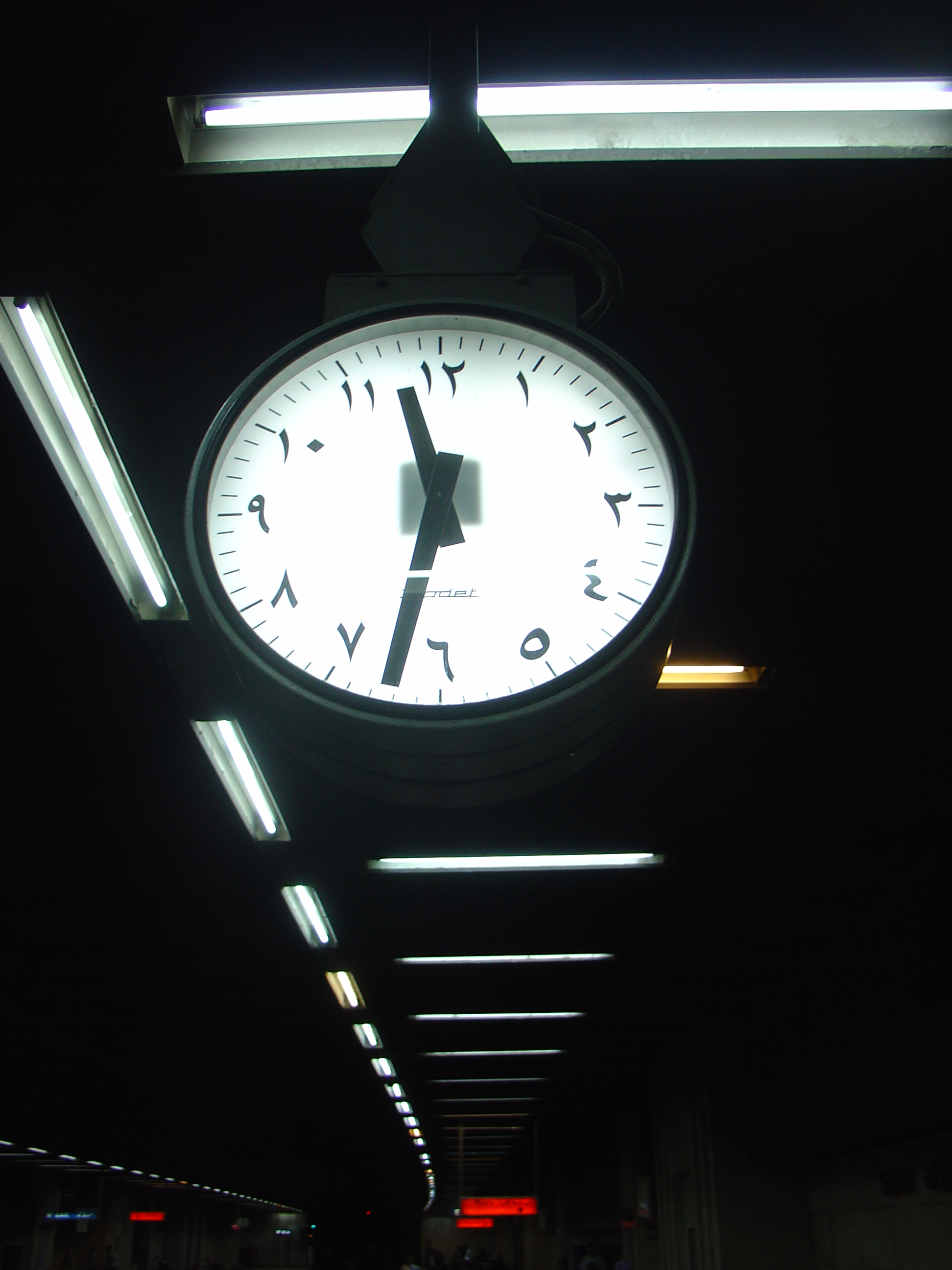
- Clock in Cairo Metro, with Eastern Arabic numerals.

UTC offset
- EGY: UTC+02:00
- EGY-ST: UTC+03:00

Current time
- :: EGY [refresh] :: EGY-ST [refresh]

Observance of DST
- DST is observed throughout this time zone.

Time in Africa: Light Blue / Cape Verde Time^{[a]} (UTC−1); Blue / Greenwich Mean Time (UTC); Red / Central European Time; West Africa Time; (UTC+1); Yellow / Central Africa Time; Eastern European Time; South African Standard Time; (UTC+2); Ochre / Egypt Standard Time (UTC+2); Ochre / Egypt Summer Time (UTC+3); Green / East Africa Time (UTC+3); Turquoise / Mauritius Time^{[b]}; Seychelles Time^{[b]}; (UTC+4)^{a} The islands of Cape Verde are west of the African mainland.^{b} Mauritius and the Seychelles are east and northeast of Madagascar, respectively.

Time in the Middle East: Offset / Zone(s); UTC+2 / Eastern European Time; Israel Standard Time; Palestine Standard Time; UTC+3 / Eastern European Summer Time; Israel Summer Time; Palestine Summer Time; UTC+3 / Arabia Standard Time; Turkey Time; UTC+3:30 / Iran Standard Time; UTC+4 / Gulf Standard Time; Standard time observed all year Daylight saving time observed

Egypt Standard Time (EGY) (Arabic: توقيت مصر القياسي Tawqīt Miṣr al-qiyāsiyy) is UTC+02:00 during the winter, which is equivalent to Eastern European Time, Central Africa Time, and South African Standard Time. It is co-linear with neighboring Libya and Sudan only during the winter months.

For energy conservation, Egypt observes Eastern European Summer Time (UTC+03:00) during the summer months, making it equivalent to Arabia Standard Time, East Africa Time, Moscow Time, and Turkey Time. Daylight Saving Time (DST) was previously used from 1957 to 2010, and from 2014 to 2015, before being reintroduced in 2023.

== History ==
On 21 April 2011, the interim government abolished summer time. Standard time was therefore observed all year long. Before the Egypt revolution, the government was planning to take a decision to abolish summer time in 2011 before President Hosni Mubarak's term expired in September 2011.

On 7 May 2014, the Egyptian interim government decided to use summer time starting from 15 May 2014, the third Friday of May, with an exception for the holy month of Ramadan. This occurred just before the Egyptian presidential elections were expected to start.

On 20 April 2015, the Egyptian government decided against observing summer time following a poll that had been held in April 2015 regarding applying DST or not. The government decided to make the necessary amendment to the laws and asked the ministers to work on a study to determine the probability of applying daylight saving time in coming years or not. The ministry of electricity assured that the achieved electricity saving from applying summer time is not of any tangible effect.

On 29 April 2016, the government under Prime Minister Sherif Ismail decided to use summer time again (UTC+03:00) by 7 July. It was to begin after Ramadan and last until the end of October. However, it was cancelled on 4 July following a vote by the Egyptian Parliament on 28 June to abolish DST, and to comply with the April 2015 presidential decree to refrain from introducing DST.

On 1 March 2023, the Egyptian Cabinet passed law 24 of 2023 to reinstate DST, moving to UTC+03:00 starting from the last Friday of April at 00:01 until the last Thursday of October at 23:59. On 16 April 2023, President Abdel Fattah el-Sisi ratified and signed the law, and the clock change took effect on 28 April of that year.

== Time zone changes ==
Period in use	Time offset from GMT	Name of time zone
Prior to 1900	UTC+02:05:09	Cairo mean time
1900–1939	UTC+02:00	Eastern European Time
15 July 1940 – 1 November 1945	UTC+02:00; UTC+03:00	Eastern European Time; Eastern European Summer Time
1946–1957	UTC+02:00	Eastern European Time
10 May 1957 – 19 April 2011	UTC+02:00; UTC+03:00	Eastern European Time; Eastern European Summer Time
20 April 2011 – 15 May 2014	UTC+02:00	Eastern European Time
16 May 2014 – 19 April 2015	UTC+02:00; UTC+03:00	Eastern European Time; Eastern European Summer Time
20 April 2015 – 27 April 2023	UTC+02:00	Eastern European Time
28 April 2023 – present	UTC+02:00; UTC+03:00	Eastern European Time; Eastern European Summer Time

== IANA time zone database ==
The IANA time zone database contains one zone for Egypt in the file zone.tab.

c.c.	Coordinates	Timezone name	Comments	UTC offset (Std.)	UTC offset (DST)
EG	+3003+03115	Africa/Cairo		+02:00	+03:00

== See also ==
- Daylight saving time in Egypt
