= Time in Africa =

Time zones used in Africa

- Time zones: Cape Verde Time; Central European Time; East Africa Time; Eastern European Time; Greenwich Mean Time; Mauritius Time; Seychelles Time; South African Standard Time; West Africa Time
- UTC offsets: UTC−01:00 to UTC+04:00
- Time notation(s): 24-hour clock 12-hour clock (uncommon)

Daylight saving time
- Observed in: Egypt
- Time zone(s): Eastern European Summer Time
- UTC offset(s): UTC+03:00
- Start: Last Friday of April
- End: Last Thursday of October
- In use since: 2023

tz database
- Africa

Africa, the world's second-largest and second-most populous continent, spans across six different time zone offsets from Coordinated Universal Time (UTC): UTC−01:00 to UTC+04:00. As Africa straddles the equator and tropics, there is little change in daylight hours throughout the year and as such daylight saving time is currently observed only in Egypt. However, it was previously observed in several other countries.

Time in Africa: Light Blue / Cape Verde Time^{[a]} (UTC−1); Blue / Greenwich Mean Time (UTC); Red / Central European Time; West Africa Time; (UTC+1); Yellow / Central Africa Time; Eastern European Time; South African Standard Time; (UTC+2); Ochre / Egypt Standard Time (UTC+2); Ochre / Egypt Summer Time (UTC+3); Green / East Africa Time (UTC+3); Turquoise / Mauritius Time^{[b]}; Seychelles Time^{[b]}; (UTC+4)^{a} The islands of Cape Verde are west of the African mainland.^{b} Mauritius and the Seychelles are east and northeast of Madagascar, respectively.

Before the wide adoption of standard time zones, local mean time was widely used in railway time for train timetables and telegraphic time for telegraphy. Local mean time is a solar time that corrects the variations of local apparent time by forming a uniform time scale at a specific longitude; for instance, Liberia observed UTC−0:44:30 instead of an approximate offset such as UTC−01:00. British Rhodesia (at the time administered by the private British South Africa Company) was the first area in Africa to adopt standard time, switching to UTC+02:30 on 1 August 1899 as the previous time standards proved problematic for the railway system. Other countries followed suit, and by 1912, most Portuguese, French and British territories had adopted a standard offset. Liberia was the last country in Africa to adopt a standard offset, doing so on 7 January 1972.

Names for the offsets vary by country and jurisdiction: in Africa, UTC+01:00 is commonly known as "West Africa Time", however Algeria, Morocco and Tunisia designate the offset by its European name, "Central European Time"; UTC+02:00 – commonly known as "Central Africa Time" – is designated as "South African Standard Time" by Eswatini, Lesotho and South Africa, whilst Egypt and Libya designate it by its European name "Eastern European Time". Cape Verde is the only country in Africa which observes UTC−01:00, where it is known as Cape Verde Time (CVT); thirteen countries observe UTC±00:00, fourteen (Note: Including the Democratic Republic of the Congo, which observes two time zones, UTC+01:00 and +2.) observe UTC+01:00, sixteen observe UTC+02:00, nine observe UTC+03:00, and two (Mauritius and Seychelles) observe UTC+04:00, where the offset is designated as Mauritius Time (MUT) and Seychelles Time (SCT) respectively.

== History ==
Before the wide adoption of standard time zones, local mean time, which is a solar time that corrects the variations of local apparent time by forming a uniform time scale at a specific longitude, such as railway time for train timetables and telegraphic time for telegraphy, was widely used. Due to the large size of the British company rule in Rhodesia, it meant Rhodesia observed three standards of time: UTC+01:30, +2:15 and +2:30; this was problematic for the railway system, so on 1 August 1899 the standard time zones UTC+02:30 was adopted nationwide, consequently resulting in this being the first standard time in Africa. This would soon be followed by Egypt, which adopted standard time on 1 October 1900; Nigeria adopted standard time on 1 July 1905, Seychelles in 1906, Mauritius on 1 January 1907, Togo in 1907, Algeria on 11 March 1911 and Tunisia on 12 April 1911. Most Portuguese territories (including Cape Verde and Mozambique) adopted standard time on 26 May 1911, followed by most remaining French and British territories on 1 July 1911 and 1 January 1912. The Gambia adopted standard time in 1918. Liberia was the last country in Africa to adopt a standard offset, doing so on 7 January 1972. The latest time change was South Sudan, which switched from UTC+3 to +2 on 1 February 2021.

== Daylight saving time ==
As Africa straddles the equator and tropics, there is little change in daylight hours throughout the year and as such daylight saving time (DST) is currently observed in only one country, Egypt, however it was also previously observed in several other countries: the countries that formerly observed DST are South Africa, which last observed it in 1944, Cape Verde in 1945, Madagascar in 1954, Ghana in 1956, Sierra Leone in 1962, Algeria and Chad in 1980, Sudan in 1985, Tunisia in 2008, Mauritius in 2009, Libya in 2012, Namibia in 2017, and Morocco in 2018 (using year-round DST from 2018 to 2026). Since 2023, Egypt has observed DST starting on last Friday of April and ending on the last Thursday of October.

== Time zones ==
Country	Time zone	Abbr.	Adopted	zone.tab
UTC−01:00 – Cape Verde Time
Cape Verde	Cape Verde Time	CVT	26 May 1911	Atlantic/Cape_Verde
UTC±00:00 – Greenwich Mean Time
Burkina Faso	Greenwich Mean Time	GMT	1 January 1912	Africa/Abidjan
Côte d'Ivoire	Greenwich Mean Time	GMT	1 January 1911	Africa/Abidjan
The Gambia	Greenwich Mean Time	GMT	1918	Africa/Abidjan
Ghana	Greenwich Mean Time	GMT	2 November 1915–31 January 1942; 24 October 1945 (readopted)	Africa/Abidjan
Guinea	Greenwich Mean Time	GMT	1 January 1912	Africa/Abidjan
Guinea-Bissau	Greenwich Mean Time	GMT	1 January 1912	Africa/Bissau
Liberia	Greenwich Mean Time	GMT	7 January 1972	Africa/Monrovia
Mali	Greenwich Mean Time	GMT	1 July 1911	Africa/Abidjan
Mauritania	Greenwich Mean Time	GMT	1 January 1912	Africa/Abidjan
Morocco	Greenwich Mean Time	GMT	20 September 2026	Africa/Casablanca
São Tomé and Príncipe	Greenwich Mean Time	GMT	1 January 1912–1 January 2018; 1 January 2019 (readopted)	Africa/Sao_Tome
Senegal	Greenwich Mean Time	GMT	1 January 1912	Africa/Abidjan
Sierra Leone	Greenwich Mean Time	GMT	1939	Africa/Abidjan
Togo	Greenwich Mean Time	GMT	1907	Africa/Abidjan
UTC+01:00 – West Africa Time (Note: Algeria and Tunisia designate this offset as "Central European Time".)
Algeria	Central European Time	CET	11 March 1911 – 25 February 1940; 7 October 1946 – 29 January 1956; 14 April 1963 – 21 October 1977; May 1981	Africa/Algiers
Angola	West Africa Time	WAT	1 January 1912	Africa/Lagos
Benin	West Africa Time	WAT	1 January 1912	Africa/Lagos
Cameroon	West Africa Time	WAT	1 January 1912	Africa/Lagos
Central African Republic	West Africa Time	WAT	1 January 1912	Africa/Lagos
Chad	West Africa Time	WAT	1 January 1912	Africa/Ndjamena
Democratic Republic of the Congo (western side)	West Africa Time	WAT	1 January 1912	Africa/Lagos
Equatorial Guinea	West Africa Time	WAT	1968 (Note: First appeared in the 1969 "Sailing Directions for Southwest Coast of Africa, Cape Palmas to Cape of Good Hope" published by the Naval Oceanographic Office, which is compiled the year before publication. Equatorial Guinea did not appear in the 1968 edition (compiled in 1967) or earlier.)	Africa/Lagos
Gabon	West Africa Time	WAT	1 January 1912	Africa/Lagos
Niger	West Africa Time	WAT	1 January 1912	Africa/Lagos
Nigeria	West Africa Time	WAT	1 July 1905–1 July 1908; 1 September 1919 (readopted)	Africa/Lagos
Republic of the Congo	West Africa Time	WAT	1 January 1912	Africa/Lagos
Tunisia	Central European Time	CET	12 April 1911	Africa/Tunis
UTC+02:00 – Central Africa Time (Note: Eswatini, Lesotho and South Africa designate this offset as "South African Standard Time" and Egypt and Libya designate it as "Eastern European Time".)
Botswana	Central Africa Time	CAT	1984	Africa/Maputo
Burundi	Central Africa Time	CAT	1968	Africa/Maputo
Democratic Republic of the Congo (eastern side)	Central Africa Time	CAT	1 January 1912	Africa/Maputo
Egypt	Eastern European Time	EET	1 October 1900	Africa/Cairo
Eswatini	South African Standard Time	SAST	1 March 1903	Africa/Johannesburg
Lesotho	South African Standard Time	SAST	1 March 1903	Africa/Johannesburg
Libya	Eastern European Time	EET	5 November 2012	Africa/Tripoli
Malawi	Central Africa Time	CAT	26 August 1966	Africa/Maputo
Mozambique	Central Africa Time	CAT	1903 (de facto); 26 May 1911 (de jure)	Africa/Maputo
Namibia	Central Africa Time	CAT	10 November 1993	Africa/Windhoek
Rwanda	Central Africa Time	CAT	1922	Africa/Maputo
South Africa	South African Standard Time	SAST	1 March 1903	Africa/Johannesburg
South Sudan	Central Africa Time	CAT	1 February 2021	Africa/Juba
Sudan	Central Africa Time	CAT	1931–15 January 2000; 1 November 2017 (readopted)	Africa/Khartoum
Zambia	Central Africa Time	CAT	1924	Africa/Maputo
Zimbabwe	Central Africa Time	CAT	8 July 1899	Africa/Maputo
UTC+03:00 – East Africa Time
Comoros	East Africa Time	EAT	1 July 1911	Africa/Nairobi
Djibouti	East Africa Time	EAT	1 July 1911	Africa/Nairobi
Eritrea	East Africa Time	EAT	24 May 1993	Africa/Nairobi
Ethiopia	East Africa Time	EAT	17 August 1942	Africa/Nairobi
Kenya	East Africa Time	EAT	31 July 1942	Africa/Nairobi
Madagascar	East Africa Time	EAT	1 July 1911	Africa/Nairobi
Somalia	East Africa Time	EAT	1 July 1911	Africa/Nairobi
Tanzania	East Africa Time	EAT	21 January 1929–1 January 1936; 1 August 1942 (readopted)	Africa/Nairobi
Uganda	East Africa Time	EAT	23 July 1976	Africa/Nairobi
UTC+04:00 – Mauritius Time; Seychelles Time
Mauritius	Mauritius Time	MUT	1 January 1907	Indian/Mauritius
Seychelles	Seychelles Time	SCT	1906	Asia/Dubai

== See also ==
- African time – a perceived cultural tendency in parts of Africa and the Caribbean toward a more relaxed attitude to time
- Daylight saving time in Africa
- Date and time notation in Africa
- Lists of time zones
- Geography of Africa
