= National Physical Laboratory (Israel) =

National measurement standards laboratory of the State of Israel

The National Physical Laboratory (He: המעבדה הלאומית לפיזיקה) is the national measurement standards laboratory of the State of Israel. The laboratory was founded in 1951 by Harry Zvi Tabor, and was inspired by similar laboratories in the United Kingdom and around the world. It is part of the Israeli Ministry of Economy.

Among other responsibilities, it is in charge of setting Israel Standard Time.

== See also ==
- National Physical Laboratory (United Kingdom)
