= Lavry =

Lavry Лавры
- Selo
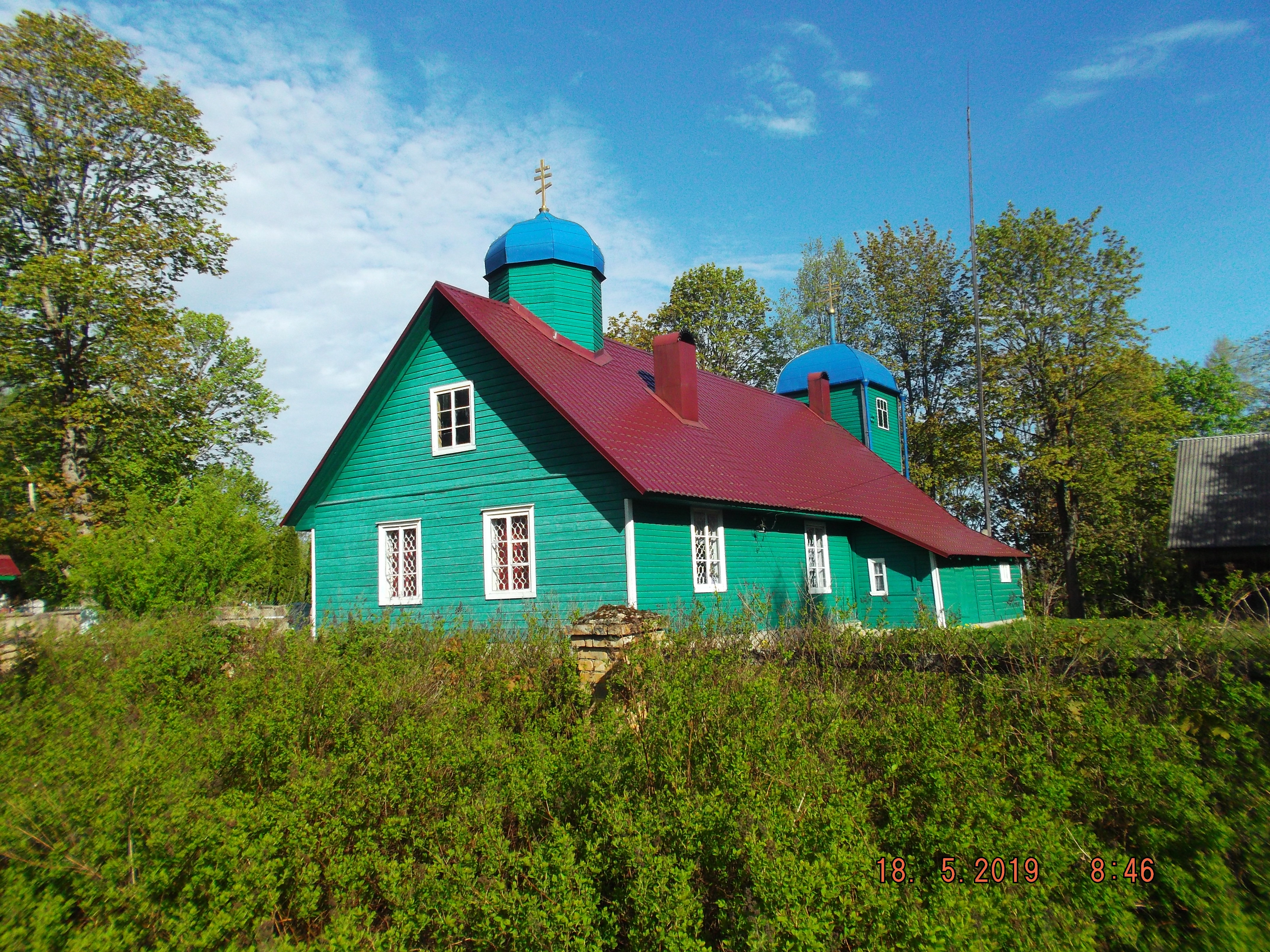
- Orthodox church of Saint Nicholas in Lavry

- Location within Pskov Oblast Location within Russia
- Coordinates: 57°34′32″N 27°28′46″E
- Country: Russia
- Region: Pskov Oblast
- District: Pechorsky District

Population (2010)
  - Total: 1,008
- Time zone: UTC+3:00

Lavry (Russian: Лавры; Estonian: Laura) is a village in Pechorsky District of Pskov Oblast, Russia. Population: 1,008 (2010 census); 888 (2002 census); . The westernmost point of mainland Russia is located near the village. Lavry is located about 400 miles west of the capital city of Moscow. Lavry is located in the "Europe/Moscow" time zone, which is three hours ahead of standard UTC time (London).
