= East Africa Time =

Time zone

- Time zone

UTC offset
- EAT: UTC+03:00

Current time
- :: EAT [refresh]

Observance of DST
- DST is not observed in this time zone.

Time in Africa: Light Blue / Cape Verde Time^{[a]} (UTC−1); Blue / Greenwich Mean Time (UTC); Red / Central European Time; West Africa Time; (UTC+1); Yellow / Central Africa Time; Eastern European Time; South African Standard Time; (UTC+2); Ochre / Egypt Standard Time (UTC+2); Ochre / Egypt Summer Time (UTC+3); Green / East Africa Time (UTC+3); Turquoise / Mauritius Time^{[b]}; Seychelles Time^{[b]}; (UTC+4)^{a} The islands of Cape Verde are west of the African mainland.^{b} Mauritius and the Seychelles are east and northeast of Madagascar, respectively.

East Africa Time, or EAT, is a time zone used in eastern Africa. The time zone is three hours ahead of UTC (UTC+03:00), which is the same as Moscow Time, Arabia Standard Time, Further-eastern European Time and Eastern European Summer Time.

As this time zone is predominantly in the equatorial region, there is no significant change in day length throughout the year and so daylight saving time is not observed.

== Geographical scope ==
East Africa Time is observed by the following countries :

- Comoros
- Djibouti
- Eritrea
- Ethiopia
- Kenya
- Madagascar
- Somalia
- Tanzania
- Uganda

South Sudan reverted to CAT (UTC+02:00) in 2021.

== Historical context ==
However in everyday life, a number of countries in this time zone continue to use a form of solar time where clocks are offset from EAT by six hours. For example, where 7.00am is treated as 1 oclock, or the first hour of daylight (see Byzantine time).

== See also ==
- Moscow Time, an equivalent time zone covering Belarus and most of European Russia, including Russian-occupied territories of Georgia, Moldova and Ukraine, also at UTC+03:00
- Turkey Time, an equivalent time zone covering Turkey, also at UTC+03:00
- Arabia Standard Time, an equivalent time zone covering Bahrain, Iraq, Kuwait, Qatar, Saudi Arabia, Syria and Yemen, also at UTC+03:00
- Eastern European Summer Time, an equivalent time zone covering European and Middle Eastern countries during daylight saving, also at UTC+03:00
- Israel Summer Time, an equivalent time zone covering the State of Israel during daylight saving, also at UTC+03:00
- Further-eastern European Time, an equivalent time zone covering extended Eastern European countries, also at UTC+03:00
