= Israel Summer Time =

Identifier for a time offset from UTC of +03:00

Time in the Middle East: Offset / Zone(s); UTC+2 / Eastern European Time; Israel Standard Time; Palestine Standard Time; UTC+3 / Eastern European Summer Time; Israel Summer Time; Palestine Summer Time; UTC+3 / Arabia Standard Time; Turkey Time; UTC+3:30 / Iran Standard Time; UTC+4 / Gulf Standard Time; Standard time observed all year Daylight saving time observed

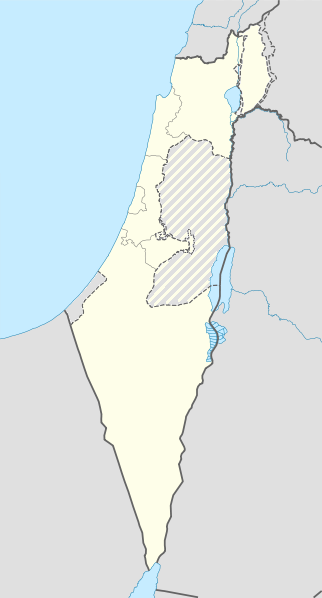
Time zone in Israel: yellow / Israel Standard Time (UTC+2); Israel Summer Time (UTC+3); Grey colours indicate areas which do not follow either IST or IDT.

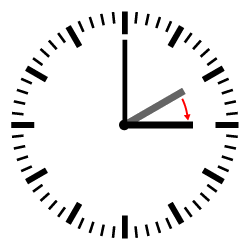
When IDT starts, clocks advance from 02:00 to 03:00.

When IDT ends, clocks retreat from 02:00 to 01:00.

Israel Summer Time (Hebrew: שעון קיץ, romanized: She'on Kayits, lit. 'Summer clock'), also known in English as Israel Daylight Time (IDT), is the practice in Israel by which clocks are advanced by an hour, beginning on the Friday before the last Sunday of March, and ending on the last Sunday of October.

== History ==
=== British Mandate ===
The origin of Israeli Summer Time lies in the period of the British Mandate. In May 1940, the Palestine Government issued the Time Determination Ordinance, which said:

During such period in each year as the High Commissioner may by order prescribe, the time for legal and general purposes in Palestine shall be three hours in advance of Greenwich Mean Time.

The time change first occurred from June 1 to September 30, 1940, and then from 17 November 1940 through all of 1941 until 31 October 1942. Summer Time in 1943 and 1944 was from April 1 to October 31, and in 1945 and 1946 it was from April 16 to October 31. There was no Summer Time in 1947.

=== Israel from 1948 to 1992 ===
The Time Determination Ordinance was inherited by Israel as part of the default adoption of Mandatory Law. Two days after the Declaration of Independence, the provisional government introduced double Summer Time in Jerusalem to save fuel, extending this to the whole of Israel from May 23. Because the shift of two hours violated the Time Determination Ordinance, the change was retrospectively legalized by the Time Determination (Amendment) Ordinance of 3 June 1948, which added "or such other period of time as may by order be prescribed" after "three hours". The two-hour time shift was reduced to one hour from 1 September 1948 and removed altogether from 1 November 1948.

The length of Summer Time has changed significantly depending on the year. In 1951–1952, it was enacted for about seven months, whereas in the years 1953–1954 it was enacted for only three months. In 1958, Summer Time was canceled. Due to the global energy crisis because of the aftermath of the Yom Kippur War, Summer Time was enacted again from 1974–1975.

Up until 1992, daylight saving time was operated by an order of the minister of the interior. In 1980 the authority of the minister for this matter was contested in an appeal to the supreme court. The supreme court decided that the minister's authority was indeed more limited than the common practice, as he may only decide on the dates of IDT while its operation is unquestionable. Following this decision the Knesset amended the Time Act so the minister will also have the authority to abolish IDT in a certain year.

=== 1992–2005 ===
The Law of Determining the Time (Hebrew: חוק קביעת הזמן Hok Kvi'at Hazman) is an Israel law governing Israeli daylight saving time. It was approved by the Knesset in 1992, replacing the Time Determination Ordinance which was inherited by Israel from the Mandate period. The 1992 time zone law stipulated that IDT will be operated for at least 150 days each year, and that the final dates will be decided by the minister of the Interior, subject to the approval of the Knesset committee for internal affairs. In some years the decision as to which day summer time would start or end was made at the last minute due to political haggling and this caused disruption to international airline schedules at Ben Gurion Airport.

This schedule was variable: the only requirement was that there be at least 150 days per year of IDT, and the dates were set out each year by the Ministry of the Interior.

=== 2005–2012 ===
Until 2005, the start and end of IDT each year was established in an ad hoc fashion as the result of haggling between political parties representing various sectors of Israeli society. Parties representing religious groups wanted the start delayed till after Passover and the end to precede Yom Kippur, the Day of Atonement, while the secular parties would argue for starting it earlier and ending it later. Thus, there was no established rule that could guarantee a predictable changeover in either direction. The debates about a fixed rule for determining the dates of IDT went on for years, and resulted in a suggestion that IDT will start on the 2nd day of Passover and end on the weekend between Rosh Hashanah and Yom Kippur. This suggestion was rejected as it stipulated an annual IDT period of only 5 months, and yet it served as the basis of the final compromise. After 2005, the annual debate has been effectively ended.

In the past, the unpredictability of IDT in Israel became frustrating enough that Microsoft Windows stopped trying to track changes and just made Israeli time be Greenwich Mean Time plus two hours (GMT+2) (and disabled the daylight saving option). This led to various ad hoc solutions to the problem in Windows systems and other Microsoft software (e.g. Outlook calendar entries were often off by an hour when shared, due to the lack of IDT support). On November 17, 2009, Microsoft released an update that had daylight saving time enabled for Israel. However, the date for transition back to Standard Time was set as the Second Sunday of September, regardless of the Hebrew Calendar date. Windows 7 does contain correct IDT times up to 2023, but not all software makes use of this extra information.

In 2010, due to an unusually large difference between the lunar based Hebrew calendar and the solar calendar the date of the return to winter time was September 12, which was very early. This sparked protests by the more secular public, and calls for a change in the way the date is determined. Many members of the government were sympathetic to this and at one point in the ensuing row the Minister even proposed moving to winter time just for Yom Kippur, the Day of Atonement and then returning to summer time. In September 2010 the argument over the dates for summer time reached new heights and some firms even refused to adopt it.

On 6 June 2011, Internal Affairs Minister Eli Yishai announced his support for extending IDT, setting the ending time to the beginning of October. The change required the approval of the Knesset.

=== 2013–present ===
On November 5, 2012, the Knesset approved the bill to extend IDT to a period of 193 days, beginning on the Friday before the last Sunday in March (at 2:00 local time, or 0:00 UTC, clocks are moved forward by one hour), and ending on the first Sunday after October 1 (at 2:00 IDT or 23:00 UTC Saturday, clocks are moved back by one hour).

If the end of IDT falls on Rosh Hashana, then IDT will end on the first Monday after October 1.

On July 8, 2013, the Knesset approved the bill to extend IDT even further. According to the bill, IDT will begin on the Friday before the last Sunday of March, and end on the last Sunday of October.

In March 2020, the Israeli government planned to delay daylight saving in order to discourage gatherings during coronavirus. However, it was decided this would be too technically difficult to implement at such short notice.

== Summer Time Dates ==
Summer Time
Year	Summer Time Begins	Summer Time Ends	Total Days
2005	March 25	October 30	219
2006	March 24	October 29	219
2007	March 23	October 28	219
2008	March 28	October 26	212
2009	March 27	October 25	212
2010	March 26	October 31	219
2011	March 25	October 30	219
2012	March 23	October 28	219
2013	March 29	October 27	212
2014	March 28	October 26	212
2015	March 27	October 25	212
2016	March 25	October 30	219
2017	March 24	October 29	219
2018	March 23	October 28	219
2019	March 29	October 27	212
2020	March 27	October 25	212
2021	March 26	October 31	219
2022	March 25	October 30	219
2023	March 24	October 29	219
2024	March 29	October 27	212
2025	March 28	October 26	212
2026	March 27	October 25	212
2027	March 26	October 31	219
2028	March 24	October 29	219
2029	March 23	October 28	219
2030	March 29	October 27	212

== See also ==
- Israel Standard Time
- Eastern European Time (EET)
- Eastern European Summer Time (EEST)
