= Israel Standard Time =

Identifier for a time offset from UTC of +02:00

Time in the Middle East: Offset / Zone(s); UTC+2 / Eastern European Time; Israel Standard Time; Palestine Standard Time; UTC+3 / Eastern European Summer Time; Israel Summer Time; Palestine Summer Time; UTC+3 / Arabia Standard Time; Turkey Time; UTC+3:30 / Iran Standard Time; UTC+4 / Gulf Standard Time; Standard time observed all year Daylight saving time observed

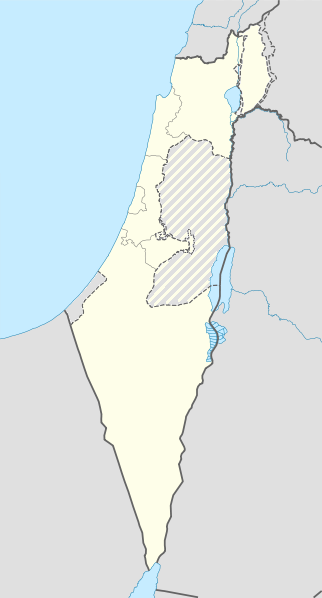
Time zone in Israel: yellow / Israel Standard Time (UTC+2); Israel Summer Time (UTC+3); Grey colours indicate areas which do not follow either IST or IDT.

Israel Standard Time (IST; Hebrew: שעון ישראל, romanized: She'on Yisra'el, lit. 'Clock of Israel') is the standard time zone in Israel. It is two hours ahead of UTC (UTC+02:00).

== Overview ==
=== History ===
At the beginning of the British Mandate, the time zone of the mandate area (present-day Israel and Jordan), was set to Cairo's time zone, which is two hours ahead of Greenwich Mean Time. The unique "Israel Standard Time" came into effect with the founding of the State of Israel in 1948, which gave Israel the authority in determining its own time, specifically to enact daylight saving time. In 1992, the Knesset replaced the British Mandate era Time Ordinance with the Law Determining the Time. This gave authority for setting the exact time with National Physical Laboratory in the Ministry of Economy. The Laboratory of Frequency and Time in the NPL maintains atomic clocks which officially set Israeli time.

=== Differences between other countries ===
The offset from UTC is equivalent to Eastern European Time (UTC+02:00), during most of the year. Because Israel switches to summer time on a Friday, rather than a Sunday as most other countries do, the change of time in spring occurs two days before the switch to summer time in Europe. The switch on a Friday is due to having the Jewish Sabbath starting on a Friday evening through Saturday as the common rest day and weekend.

Prior to 2013, Israel Daylight Time ended earlier in autumn, and the time was identical to Central European Summer Time for between two and seven weeks during these months.

Israel also shares the UTC+02:00 time offset with Egypt, Lebanon, and Cyprus.

=== Daylight saving time ===
Israel observes daylight saving time, locally called Israel Summer Time (Hebrew: שעון קיץ She'on Kayits, sometimes abbreviated in English as IDT).

Since July 2013, IDT begins on the Friday before the last Sunday of March, and ends on the last Sunday of October.

== Issues ==
Due to the differing time policies between the Israeli government and the Palestinian Authority, time zones can change unexpectedly for residents as they travel. Israelis and Palestinians have reported sudden time changes that lead to scheduling errors and conflicts, as well as phones that change the time unexpectedly. In some cases, phones in the same area will show different times depending on whether the phone number is Israeli or Palestinian. Both authorities have at times changed the onset of daylight saving time or standard (winter) time at short notice, exacerbating the issue.

As mentioned above, there are also issues that arise from Israel's unusual Friday/Saturday weekend when changing to summer time. Israel changes its clocks on Thursday night/Friday morning, in time for the start of the weekend, while the Palestinian Authority changes its clocks on the Sunday night.

== See also ==
- Israel Summer Time
- Daylight saving time
- Relative hour – Hebrew term ascribed to an hour of a 12-hour day and how it is to be reckoned
