= Time in Palestine =

Time in the Middle East: Offset / Zone(s); UTC+2 / Eastern European Time; Israel Standard Time; Palestine Standard Time; UTC+3 / Eastern European Summer Time; Israel Summer Time; Palestine Summer Time; UTC+3 / Arabia Standard Time; Turkey Time; UTC+3:30 / Iran Standard Time; UTC+4 / Gulf Standard Time; Standard time observed all year Daylight saving time observed

The time zones in Palestine are Palestine Standard Time (PSST; Arabic: توقيت فلسطين القياسي; UTC+02:00) and Palestine Summer Time (PSDT; Arabic: توقيت فلسطين الصيفي; UTC+03:00). Palestine first observed daylight saving time in 1940 under the British Mandate. Palestine has observed DST for 63 years between 1940 and 2025. The previous time with no daylight saving time was 1983. The Palestinian Authority announces the dates for the start and end of summer time. In 2020, they announced the end of summer time on 19 October, only 5 days before the change.

== Israeli settlements ==
The Israeli settlements in the occupied West Bank adhere to Israel Standard Time, which switches to Israel Summer Time on a different date than Palestine switches to Palestine Summer Time. This creates a one-hour difference for a few days for different groups of people living in the same geographic area.

== IANA time zone database ==
In the IANA time zone database, Palestine is given two zone identifiers in the file zone.tab: Asia/Gaza serving the Gaza Strip; and Asia/Hebron serving West Bank. These zones use EET (normal) and EEST (summer daylight) for their time zone abbreviations.
