= West Africa Time =

Time zone

- Time zone

UTC offset
- WAT: UTC+01:00

Current time
- :: WAT [refresh]

Observance of DST
- DST is not observed in this time zone.

Time in Africa: Light Blue / Cape Verde Time^{[a]} (UTC−1); Blue / Greenwich Mean Time (UTC); Red / Central European Time; West Africa Time; (UTC+1); Yellow / Central Africa Time; Eastern European Time; South African Standard Time; (UTC+2); Ochre / Egypt Standard Time (UTC+2); Ochre / Egypt Summer Time (UTC+3); Green / East Africa Time (UTC+3); Turquoise / Mauritius Time^{[b]}; Seychelles Time^{[b]}; (UTC+4)^{a} The islands of Cape Verde are west of the African mainland.^{b} Mauritius and the Seychelles are east and northeast of Madagascar, respectively.

West Africa Time, or WAT, is a time zone used in west-central Africa. West Africa Time is one hour ahead of Coordinated Universal Time (UTC+01:00), which aligns it with Central European Time (CET) during winter, and Western European Summer Time (WEST) / British Summer Time (BST) during summer.

As most of this time zone is in the tropical region, there is little change in day length throughout the year and therefore daylight saving time is not observed.

West Africa Time is the time zone for the following countries:

- Algeria (as Central European Time)
- Angola
- Benin
- Cameroon
- Central African Republic
- Chad
- Democratic Republic of the Congo (western provinces)
- Equatorial Guinea
- Gabon
- Niger
- Nigeria
- Republic of the Congo
- Tunisia (as Central European Time)
- Western Sahara

Countries west of Benin are in the UTC+00:00 time zone.

== See also ==
- Central European Time, an equivalent time zone covering most European countries during winter, also at UTC+01:00
- Western European Summer Time, an equivalent time zone covering western European countries during daylight saving, also at UTC+01:00
- British Summer Time, an equivalent time zone covering the United Kingdom during daylight saving, also at UTC+01:00
