= Central Africa Time =

Time zone

- Time zone

UTC offset
- CAT: UTC+02:00

Current time
- :: CAT [refresh]

Observance of DST
- DST is not observed in this time zone.

Time in Africa: Light Blue / Cape Verde Time^{[a]} (UTC−1); Blue / Greenwich Mean Time (UTC); Red / Central European Time; West Africa Time; (UTC+1); Yellow / Central Africa Time; Eastern European Time; South African Standard Time; (UTC+2); Ochre / Egypt Standard Time (UTC+2); Ochre / Egypt Summer Time (UTC+3); Green / East Africa Time (UTC+3); Turquoise / Mauritius Time^{[b]}; Seychelles Time^{[b]}; (UTC+4)^{a} The islands of Cape Verde are west of the African mainland.^{b} Mauritius and the Seychelles are east and northeast of Madagascar, respectively.

Central Africa Time or CAT, is a time zone used in north central, east central and southern Africa. Central Africa Time is two hours ahead of Coordinated Universal Time (UTC+02:00), which is the same as the adjacent South Africa Standard Time, Egypt Standard Time, Eastern European Time, Kaliningrad Time and Central European Summer Time.

As this time zone is in the equatorial and tropical regions, there is little change in day length throughout the year and so daylight saving time is not observed.

Central Africa Time is observed by the following countries:

- Botswana
- Burundi
- DR Congo (eastern provinces)
- Malawi
- Mozambique
- Namibia
- Rwanda
- Sudan
- South Sudan
- Zambia
- Zimbabwe

The following countries in Africa also use an offset of UTC+02:00 all-year round:

- Eswatini (observes South African Standard Time)
- Lesotho (observes South African Standard Time)
- Libya (observes Eastern European Time)
- South Africa (observes South African Standard Time)

== See also ==
- Egypt Standard Time, an equivalent (except during daylight saving) time zone covering Egypt, also at UTC+02:00
- Kaliningrad Time, an equivalent time zone covering Kaliningrad Oblast, Russia, also at UTC+02:00
- Israel Standard Time, an equivalent time zone covering the State of Israel during winter, also at UTC+02:00
- Eastern European Time, an equivalent time zone covering European and Middle Eastern countries during winter, also at UTC+02:00
- Central European Summer Time, an equivalent time zone covering most European countries during daylight saving, also at UTC+02:00
- South African Standard Time, an equivalent time zone covering South Africa, also at UTC+02:00
