= UTC+03:00 =

Identifier for a time offset from UTC of +3

- Time zone
- World map with the time zone highlighted

UTC offset
- UTC: UTC+03:00

Current time
- 22:32, 7 September 2026 UTC+03:00 [refresh]

Central meridian
- 45 degrees E

Date-time group
- C

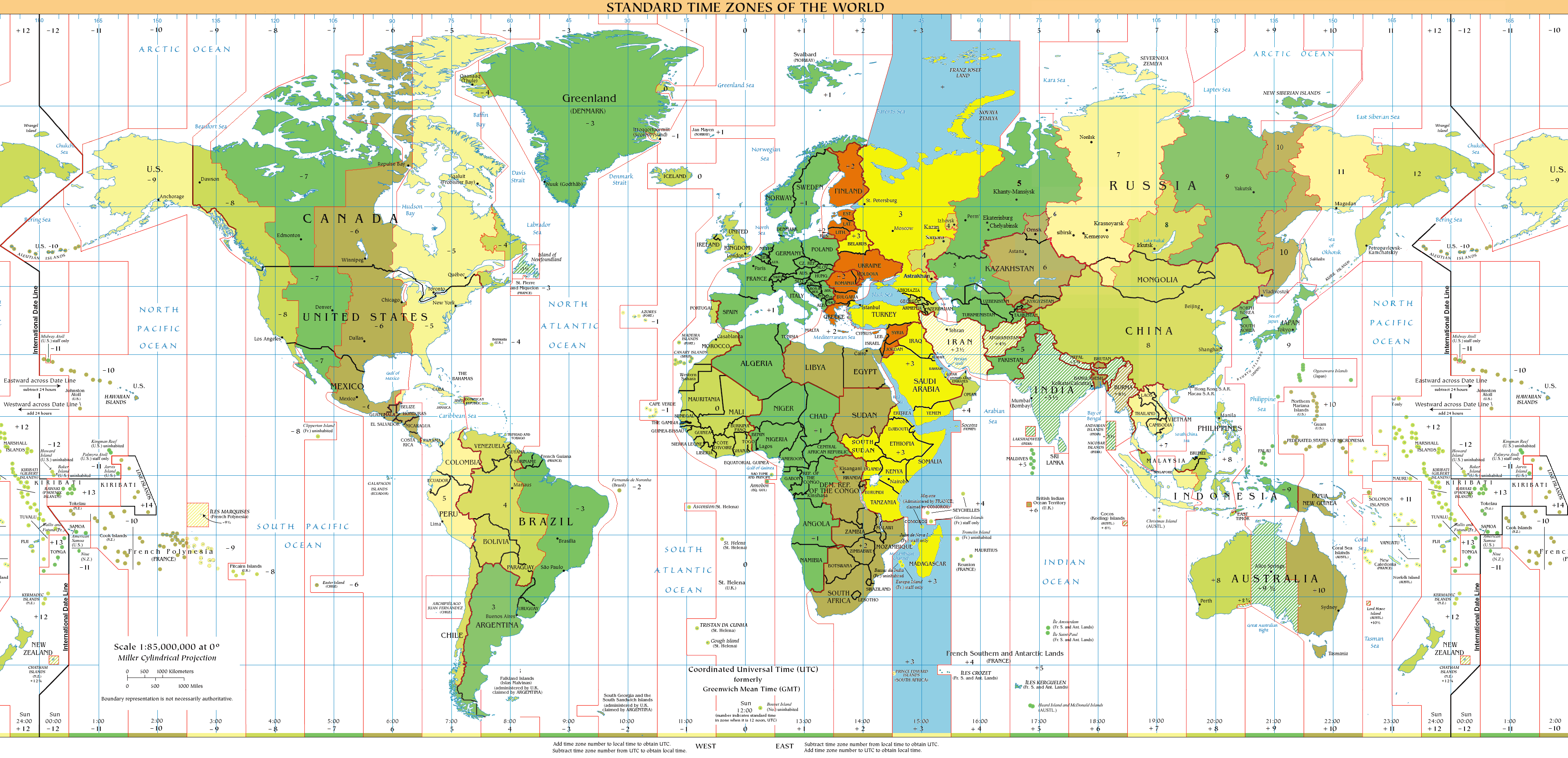
UTC+03:00 – 2011: orange (DST Northern Hemisphere), yellow (year-round), light blue (sea areas)

Time in Africa: Light Blue / Cape Verde Time^{[a]} (UTC−1); Blue / Greenwich Mean Time (UTC); Red / Central European Time; West Africa Time; (UTC+1)^{[b]}; Yellow / Central Africa Time; Eastern European Time; South African Standard Time; (UTC+2); Ochre / Egypt Standard Time (UTC+2); Ochre / Egypt Summer Time (UTC+3); Green / East Africa Time (UTC+3); Turquoise / Mauritius Time^{[d]}; Seychelles Time^{[d]}; (UTC+4)^{a} The islands of Cape Verde lie west of the African mainland.^{b} In September 2026, Morocco will switch permanently to Greenwich Mean Time.^{d} Mauritius and the Seychelles lie to the east and northeast of Madagascar, respectively.

Time in the Middle East: Offset / Zone(s); UTC+2 / Eastern European Time; Israel Standard Time; Palestine Standard Time; UTC+3 / Eastern European Summer Time; Israel Summer Time; Palestine Summer Time; UTC+3 / Arabia Standard Time; Turkey Time; UTC+3:30 / Iran Standard Time; UTC+4 / Gulf Standard Time; Standard time observed all year Daylight saving time observed

Time in Europe: Light Blue / Western European Time / Greenwich Mean Time (UTC); Blue / Western European Time / Greenwich Mean Time (UTC); Blue / Western European Summer Time / British Summer Time / Irish Standard Time (UTC+1); Red / Central European Time (UTC+1); Red / Central European Summer Time (UTC+2); Yellow / Eastern European Time / Kaliningrad Time (UTC+2); Ochre / Eastern European Time (UTC+2); Ochre / Eastern European Summer Time (UTC+3); Green / Moscow Time / Turkey Time (UTC+3); Turquoise / Armenia Time / Azerbaijan Time / Georgia Time / Samara Time (UTC+4); ▉▉▉▉ Pale hues: Standard time observed all year ▉▉▉ Dark hues: Daylight saving time

Time in Russia: KALT / Kaliningrad Time / UTC+2 / (MSK−1); MSK / Moscow Time / UTC+3 / (MSK±0); SAMT / Samara Time / UTC+4 / (MSK+1); YEKT / Yekaterinburg Time / UTC+5 / (MSK+2); OMST / Omsk Time / UTC+6 / (MSK+3); KRAT / Krasnoyarsk Time / UTC+7 / (MSK+4); IRKT / Irkutsk Time / UTC+8 / (MSK+5); YAKT / Yakutsk Time / UTC+9 / (MSK+6); VLAT / Vladivostok Time / UTC+10 / (MSK+7); MAGT / Magadan Time / UTC+11 / (MSK+8); PETT / Kamchatka Time / UTC+12 / (MSK+9)

UTC+03:00 is an identifier for a time offset from UTC of +03:00. In areas using this time offset, the time is three hours ahead of the Coordinated Universal Time (UTC). Following the ISO 8601 standard, a time with this offset would be written as, for example, 2019-02-08T23:36:06+03:00.

== As standard time (year-round) ==
Principal cities: Istanbul, Moscow, Saint Petersburg, Doha, Riyadh, Baghdad, Nairobi, Dire Dawa, Addis Ababa, Manama, Sanaa, Aden, Minsk, Kuwait City, Asmara, Antananarivo, Kampala, Amman, Damascus, Dar es Salaam, Mogadishu

=== Africa ===
==== East Africa ====
- Comoros
- Djibouti
- Eritrea
- Ethiopia
- France
  - French Southern and Antarctic Lands
    - Scattered Islands in the Indian Ocean
      - Bassas da India, Europa Island and Juan de Nova Island
  - Mayotte
- Kenya
- Madagascar
- Somalia
- South Africa
  - Prince Edward Islands
- Tanzania
- Uganda

=== Antarctica ===
- Some bases in Antarctica. See also Time in Antarctica.
  - Japan
    - Showa Station

=== Asia ===
==== Arabia Standard Time ====
Arabia Standard Time, or AST (indicated by KSA on some Arabic TV stations), is used by some of the countries in the Middle East. As this time zone is predominantly in the equatorial region, there is no significant change in day length throughout the year, so daylight saving time is not observed. Between 1982 and 2007, Iraq observed Arabia Daylight Time (UTC+04:00) but the government abolished DST in March 2008.

Arabia Standard Time is used by the following countries:

- Bahrain
- Iraq
- Jordan
- Kuwait
- Qatar
- Saudi Arabia (Note: Saudi Arabia follows its own time zone, known as Saudi Arabia Standard Time (SAST).)
- Syria
- Yemen

=== Europe ===
Most of European Russia, including Moscow, Saint Petersburg, Krasnodar, Rostov-on-Don, Novaya Zemlya, Franz Josef Land. From October 26, 2014 Moscow and most other parts of European Russia started using UTC+03:00 again, year-round. Also on September 7, 2016, Turkey started using UTC+03:00 year-round. Besides the names mentioned above, the name "Eastern Europe Forward Time"' (EEFT) is sometimes used.

- Belarus
- Russia – Moscow Time
  - Central Federal District
  - North Caucasian Federal District
  - Northwestern Federal District
    - Except Kaliningrad Oblast
  - Southern Federal District
    - Except Astrakhan Oblast
  - Volga Federal District
    - Except Samara Oblast, Saratov Oblast, Udmurtia, Ulyanovsk Oblast, Bashkortostan, Orenburg Oblast and Perm Krai
- Turkey – Time in Turkey
- Ukraine
  - Russian-occupied territories of Ukraine - Republic of Crimea, Sevastopol, Luhansk People's Republic, part of Donetsk People's Republic, part of Kherson Oblast and part of Zaporizhzhia Oblast

==== Caucasus region ====
- Georgia (while Georgia remains within UTC+04:00, its two breakaway regions have opted to use UTC+03:00) this includes:
  - Abkhazia
  - South Ossetia

== As daylight saving time (Northern Hemisphere summer only) ==
Principal cities: Kyiv, Bucharest, Athens, Jerusalem, Sofia, Cairo

=== Europe ===
- Bulgaria
- Cyprus
- Estonia
- Finland
  - Åland
- Greece
- Latvia
- Lithuania
- Moldova
  - Transnistria
- Romania
- Ukraine
  - Russian-occupied territories of Ukraine
- United Kingdom
  - Akrotiri and Dhekelia

=== Asia ===
- Israel
- Lebanon
- Palestine

=== Africa ===
- Egypt

== Discrepancies between official UTC+03:00 and geographical UTC+03:00 ==
=== Areas in UTC+03:00 longitudes using other time zones ===
Using UTC+04:00:

- Caucasus region:
  - Georgia, excluding Abkhazia and South Ossetia
  - Armenia
  - Azerbaijan
- Russia, with parts of its territories:
  - Astrakhan, Samara, Saratov and Ulyanovsk (with an exception of the very east)
  - Western half of Udmurtia
- United Arab Emirates
  - The westernmost region of the Emirate of Abu Dhabi
- Seychelles
  - Aldabra Group
    - Cosmoledo Atoll
  - Farquhar Group
- French Southern and Antarctic Lands
  - Crozet Islands

Using UTC+03:30:

- Iran
  - The western part, including Tehran

Using UTC+02:00:

- Ukraine (standard time)
  - The easternmost part, including Luhansk (the territories under Ukrainian control)
- Sudan
  - The very easternmost part in the country
- Mozambique
  - Most of the northeast, including Montepuez and Nampula

=== Areas outside UTC+03:00 longitudes using UTC+03:00 time ===
==== Areas between 67°30′ E and 82°30′ E ("physical" UTC+05:00) ====
- Russia
  - The very east of Severny Island with 69°2' E as the easternmost point

==== Areas between 52°30' E and 67°30' E ("physical" UTC+04:00) ====
- Yemen
  - Socotra, the largest island in the Socotra Archipelago
  - The very easternmost part of Al-Mahrah
- Saudi Arabia
  - The easternmost part of Sharqiyah
- Russia
  - Most of Franz Josef Land, Yuzhny Island, and most of Severny Island (with an exception of the very east)
  - Some parts of the Russian mainland (Komi Republic, Nenets Autonomous Okrug, east of Kirov Oblast and Tatarstan)

==== Areas between 22°30' E and 37°30' E ("physical" UTC+02:00) ====
- Tanzania
  - The western part, including Mwanza and Mbeya
- Uganda
- Kenya
  - The western part, including nation's capital Nairobi
- Ethiopia
  - The western part, including Nekemte and Jimma
- Saudi Arabia
  - The northwesternmost part, including Tabuk
- Turkey
  - Most parts of the country, including Istanbul and nation's capital Ankara
- Ukraine
  - Russian-occupied territories of Ukraine
- Belarus
- Russia
  - The western part, including Saint Petersburg and half of Moscow

== Notes ==
1. The westernmost point at UTC+03:00 is the westernmost point of contiguous Russia, near Lavry, Pskov Oblast (27°19' E). The time zone employed there (corresponding to 45°E) is 17°41' E of physical time, i.e. roughly 1 hour and 11 minutes ahead of physical time, making for the largest overall discrepancy between time used and physical time for UTC+03:00.
2. The easternmost point at UTC+03:00 is Cape Zhelaniya, Severny Island, Novaya Zemlya, Russia (69°06' E). The time zone employed there (corresponding to 45°E) is 24°06' W of physical time, i.e. roughly 1 hour and 36 minutes behind physical time, making for the largest discrepancy between time used and physical time for UTC+03:00.
3. On February 8, 2011, Russian president Dmitry Medvedev issued a decree cancelling daylight saving time in Russia. Under the decree, all clocks in Russia advanced by 1 hour on March 27, 2011, but did not change back the following October, effectively making Kaliningrad Time UTC+03:00 permanently, and Moscow Time UTC+04:00 permanently. This proved unpopular because of the dark mornings, children walking to school and people going to work in complete darkness. On October 26, 2014, Russia permanently returned to standard time by setting the clocks back by 1 hour effectively making Kaliningrad Time UTC+02:00 permanently and Moscow Time UTC+03:00 permanently.
4. Ukraine had UTC+02:00 plus regularly EEST from 1990 till 2011 (in years 1981–1990 Moscow Summer Time) until the Ukrainian parliament added 1 hour "on the territory of Ukraine from March 27, 2011" and canceled daylight saving time on September 20, 2011, de facto making EEST (UTC+03:00) the new standard time. After strong criticism from the mass media, on 18 October 2011 the Ukrainian parliament cancelled its previous decision.

== See also ==
- Time in Ethiopia
- Time in Russia
