= UTC+04:00 =

Identifier for a time offset from UTC of +4

- Time zone
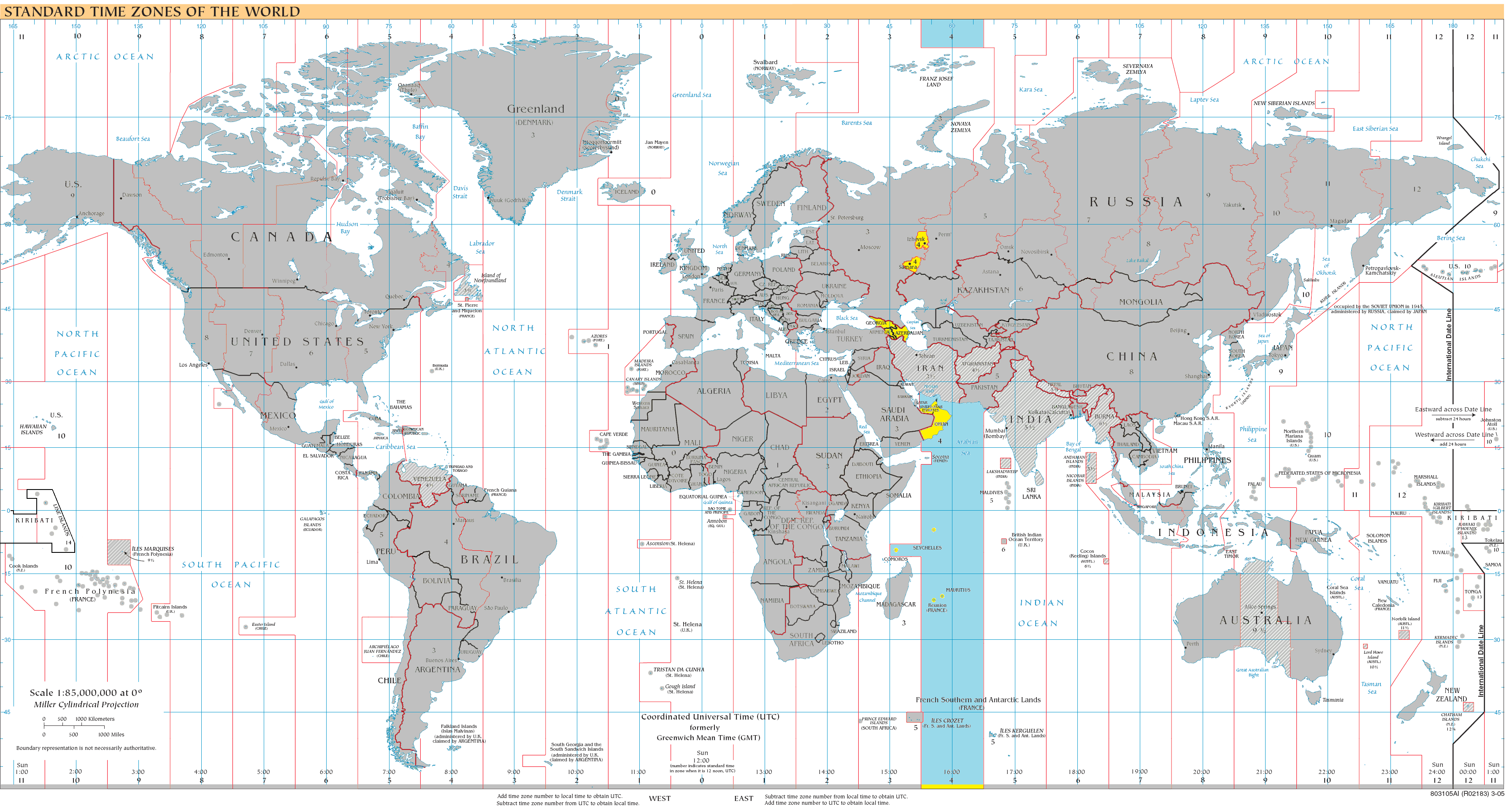
- World map with the time zone highlighted

UTC offset
- UTC: UTC+04:00

Current time
- 22:37, 15 June 2026 UTC+04:00 [refresh]

Central meridian
- 60 degrees E

Date-time group
- D

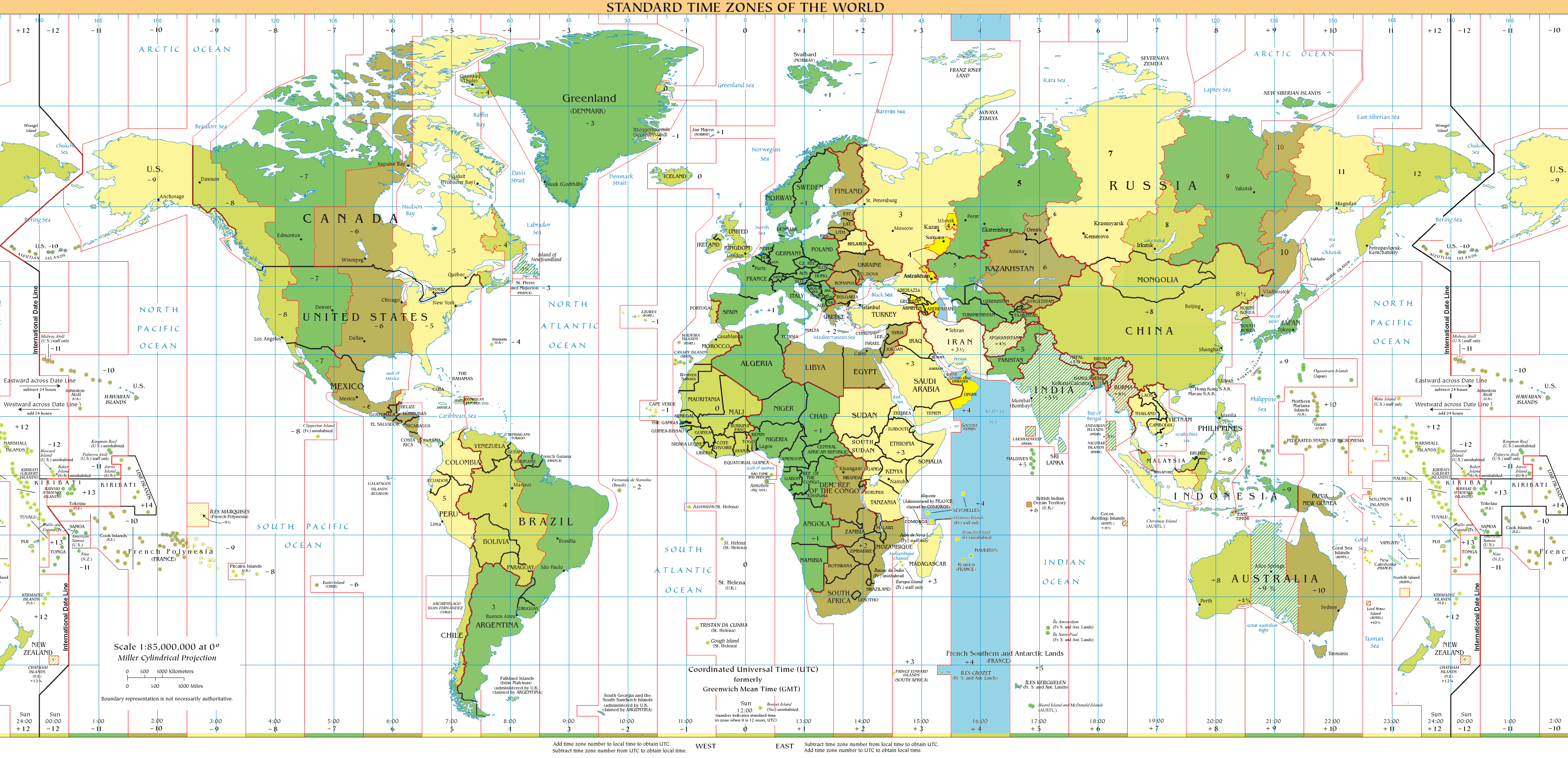
UTC+04:00 – 2010: yellow (year-round), blue (DST Northern Hemisphere), light blue (sea areas)

Time in the Middle East: Offset / Zone(s); UTC+2 / Eastern European Time; Israel Standard Time; Palestine Standard Time; UTC+3 / Eastern European Summer Time; Israel Summer Time; Palestine Summer Time; UTC+3 / Arabia Standard Time; Turkey Time; UTC+3:30 / Iran Standard Time; UTC+4 / Gulf Standard Time; Standard time observed all year Daylight saving time observed

Time in Europe: Light Blue / Western European Time / Greenwich Mean Time (UTC); Blue / Western European Time / Greenwich Mean Time (UTC); Blue / Western European Summer Time / British Summer Time / Irish Standard Time (UTC+1); Red / Central European Time (UTC+1); Red / Central European Summer Time (UTC+2); Yellow / Eastern European Time / Kaliningrad Time (UTC+2); Ochre / Eastern European Time (UTC+2); Ochre / Eastern European Summer Time (UTC+3); Green / Moscow Time / Turkey Time (UTC+3); Turquoise / Armenia Time / Azerbaijan Time / Georgia Time / Samara Time (UTC+4); Pink / Kazakhstan Time / Yekaterinburg Time (UTC+5); ▉▉▉▉ Pale hues: Standard time observed all year ▉▉▉ Dark hues: Daylight saving time

Time in Russia: KALT / Kaliningrad Time / UTC+2 / (MSK−1); MSK / Moscow Time / UTC+3 / (MSK±0); SAMT / Samara Time / UTC+4 / (MSK+1); YEKT / Yekaterinburg Time / UTC+5 / (MSK+2); OMST / Omsk Time / UTC+6 / (MSK+3); KRAT / Krasnoyarsk Time / UTC+7 / (MSK+4); IRKT / Irkutsk Time / UTC+8 / (MSK+5); YAKT / Yakutsk Time / UTC+9 / (MSK+6); VLAT / Vladivostok Time / UTC+10 / (MSK+7); MAGT / Magadan Time / UTC+11 / (MSK+8); PETT / Kamchatka Time / UTC+12 / (MSK+9)

Time in Africa: Light Blue / Cape Verde Time^{[a]} (UTC−1); Blue / Greenwich Mean Time (UTC); Red / Central European Time; West Africa Time; (UTC+1)^{[b]}; Yellow / Central Africa Time; Eastern European Time; South African Standard Time; (UTC+2); Ochre / Egypt Standard Time (UTC+2); Ochre / Egypt Summer Time (UTC+3); Green / East Africa Time (UTC+3); Turquoise / Mauritius Time^{[d]}; Seychelles Time^{[d]}; (UTC+4)^{a} The islands of Cape Verde lie west of the African mainland.^{b} During Ramadan, Morocco switches to Greenwich Mean Time (UTC) and returns to UTC+1 after it ends.^{d} Mauritius and the Seychelles lie to the east and northeast of Madagascar, respectively.

UTC+04:00 is an identifier for a time offset from UTC of +04:00. In ISO 8601, the associated time would be written as 2019-02-07T23:28:34+04:00. This time is used in: Oman, the United Arab Emirates, Armenia, Azerbaijan, Seychelles, Mauritius, and Georgia, as well as Russia.

== As standard time (year-round) ==
Principal cities: Abu Dhabi, Dubai, Baku, Tbilisi, Yerevan, Samara, Muscat, Port Louis, Victoria, Saint-Denis, Stepanakert

=== Europe ===
==== Eastern Europe ====
- Russia – Samara Time
  - Southern Federal District
    - Astrakhan Oblast
  - Volga Federal District
    - Samara Oblast
    - Saratov Oblast
    - Udmurtia
    - Ulyanovsk Oblast

===== South Caucasus =====
- Armenia – Armenia Time (used DST in 1981–2012)
- Azerbaijan – Azerbaijan Time (used DST in 1981–2016)
- Georgia – Georgia Time
  - Except Abkhazia and South Ossetia
    - Georgia moved from zone UTC+04:00 to UTC+03:00 on June 27, 2004, then back to UTC+04:00 on March 27, 2005.

=== Asia ===
==== Middle East ====
- Oman – Time in Oman
- United Arab Emirates – United Arab Emirates Standard Time

=== Africa ===
- France
  - French Southern and Antarctic Lands
    - Crozet Islands
    - Scattered Islands in the Indian Ocean
      - Glorioso Islands and Tromelin Island
  - Réunion
- Mauritius – Mauritius Time
  - Mauritius tried DST in 2008 but decided not to continue
- Seychelles – Seychelles Time

== Discrepancies between official UTC+04:00 and geographical UTC+04:00 ==
=== Areas in UTC+04:00 longitudes using other time zones ===
Using UTC+03:00:

- Yemen
  - Socotra, the largest island in the Socotra Archipelago
  - The easternmost part of Al-Mahrah
- Saudi Arabia
  - The easternmost part of Sharqiyah
- Russia
  - Most of Franz Josef Land, Yuzhny Island, and most of Severny Island (with an exception of the very east)
  - Some parts of the Russian mainland (Komi Republic, Nenets Autonomous Okrug, east of Kirov Oblast and Tatarstan)

Using UTC+03:30:

- Most parts of Iran

Using UTC+04:30:

- Western parts of Afghanistan

Using UTC+05:00:

- Turkmenistan
- Kazakhstan
  - Aktobe
  - Kyzylorda
  - Parts of Mangystau, Atyrau, and West Kazakhstan
  - Kostanay
  - A smaller parts of Turkistan
  - Western parts of Karaganda, Akmola, and North Kazakhstan
- Uzbekistan
  - Most parts of the country, including Samarkand
- Pakistan
  - Western parts, including Karachi
- Russia
  - Bashkortostan, Orenburg Oblast, Perm Krai, most parts of the Ural Federal District

=== Areas outside UTC+04:00 longitudes using UTC+04:00 time ===
==== Areas between 37°30' E and 52°30' E ("physical" UTC+03:00) ====
- Caucasus region:
  - Georgia, excluding Abkhazia and South Ossetia
  - Armenia
  - Azerbaijan
- Russia, with parts of its territories:
  - Astrakhan, Samara, Saratov and Ulyanovsk (with an exception of the very east)
  - Western half of Udmurtia
- United Arab Emirates
  - The westernmost region of the Emirate of Abu Dhabi
- Seychelles
  - Aldabra Group
    - Cosmoledo Atoll
  - Farquhar Group
- French Southern and Antarctic Lands
  - Crozet Islands
