= Cape Verde Time =

Cape Verde time zone, UTC minus one hour

Time in Africa: Light Blue / Cape Verde Time^{[a]} (UTC−1); Blue / Greenwich Mean Time (UTC); Red / Central European Time; West Africa Time; (UTC+1)^{[b]}; Yellow / Central Africa Time; Eastern European Time; South African Standard Time; (UTC+2); Ochre / Egypt Standard Time (UTC+2); Ochre / Egypt Summer Time (UTC+3); Green / East Africa Time (UTC+3); Turquoise / Mauritius Time^{[d]}; Seychelles Time^{[d]}; (UTC+4)^{a} The islands of Cape Verde lie west of the African mainland.^{b} During Ramadan, Morocco switches to Greenwich Mean Time (UTC) and returns to UTC+1 after it ends.^{d} Mauritius and the Seychelles lie to the east and northeast of Madagascar, respectively.

Cape Verde Time (CVT) is a time zone used by the Atlantic island nation of Cape Verde. The zone is one hour behind UTC (UTC−01:00).

This time zone applies all the year round. Due to its geographical location, completely west of the meridian 22°30'W (which forms the boundary between UTC−01:00 and UTC−02:00) Cape Verde effectively observes permanent daylight saving, given that the position of the archipelago is totally within the boundaries of UTC−02:00, the time zone observed until 1975.
