= UTC−01:00 =

Time in Cape Verde, the Azores and east Greenland

- Time zone
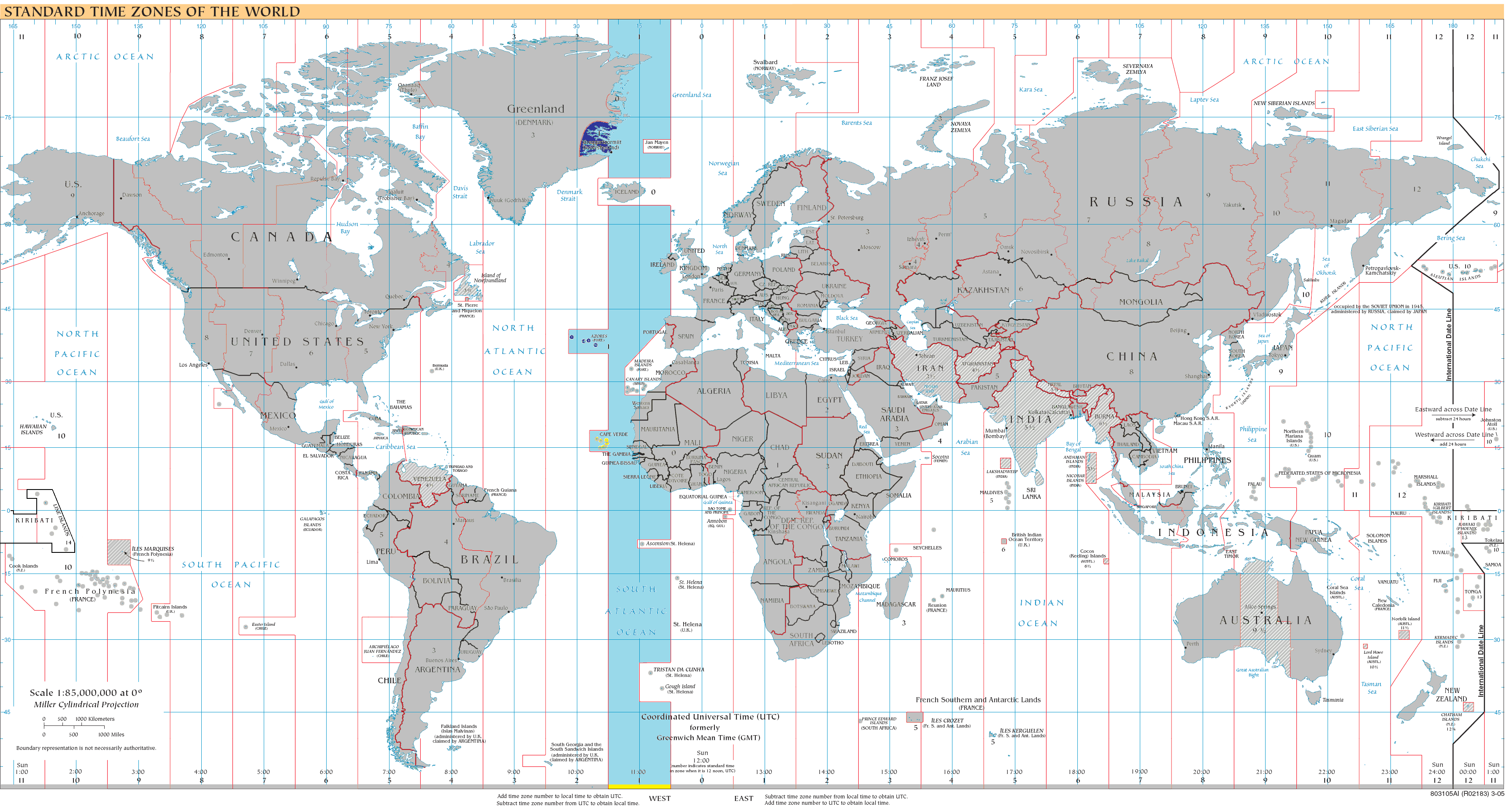
- World map with the time zone highlighted

UTC offset
- UTC: UTC−01:00

Current time
- :: UTC−01:00 [refresh]

Central meridian
- 15 degrees W

Date-time group
- N

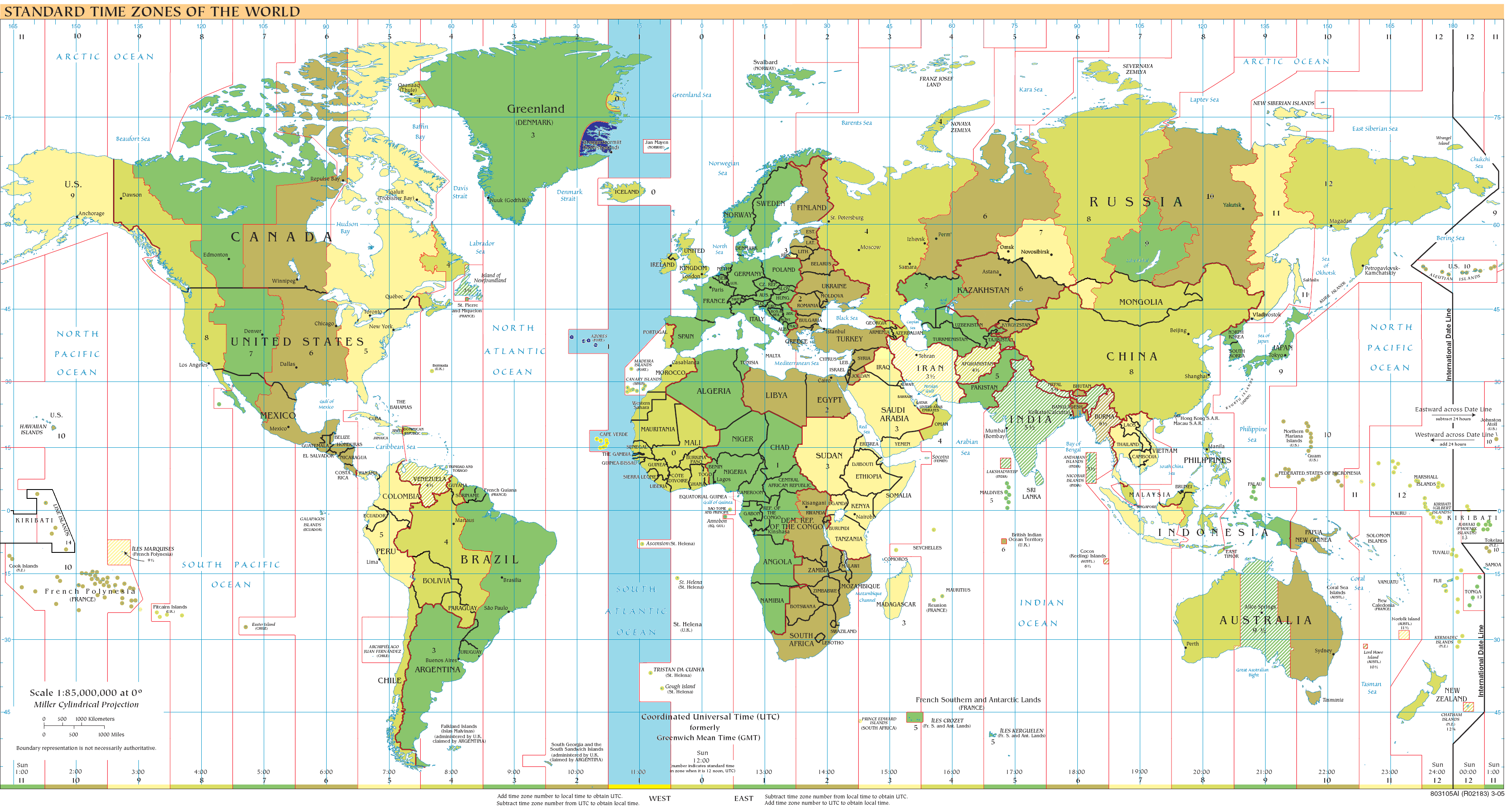
UTC−01:00: blue (December), orange (June), yellow (year-round), light blue (sea areas)

Time in Africa: Light Blue / Cape Verde Time^{[a]} (UTC−1); Blue / Greenwich Mean Time (UTC); Red / Central European Time; West Africa Time; (UTC+1); Yellow / Central Africa Time; Eastern European Time; South African Standard Time; (UTC+2); Ochre / Egypt Standard Time (UTC+2); Ochre / Egypt Summer Time (UTC+3); Green / East Africa Time (UTC+3); Turquoise / Mauritius Time^{[b]}; Seychelles Time^{[b]}; (UTC+4)^{a} The islands of Cape Verde are west of the African mainland.^{b} Mauritius and the Seychelles are east and northeast of Madagascar, respectively.

UTC−01:00 is an identifier for a time offset from UTC of −01:00.

== As standard time (Northern Hemisphere winter) ==
=== Atlantic Ocean ===
- Portugal
  - Azores islands

== As daylight saving time (Northern Hemisphere summer) ==
=== North America ===
- Greenland (summer)
  - Except areas around Danmarkshavn, and Pituffik (Thule)

== As standard time (year-round) ==
=== Africa ===
==== Atlantic Ocean ====
- Cape Verde

== Anomalies ==
=== Regions in UTC−02:00 longitudes using UTC−01:00 time ===
- The westernmost part of legal UTC-01:00 area in Ittoqqortoormiit Municipality (East Greenland)
- Azores islands (Portugal)
- Cape Verde

=== Areas in UTC−01:00 longitudes using other time zones ===
==== Using UTC−02:00 ====
- The easternmost tip of Greenland (excluding legal UTC-1 and UTC±0 areas)

==== Using UTC±00:00 ====
In Africa:

- Almost all of Liberia
- Sierra Leone
- Guinea
- Guinea-Bissau
- Senegal
- Gambia
- Southwestern part of Morocco, including Casablanca
- Western Sahara
- Sahrawi Arab Democratic Republic (disputed territory)
- Most of Mauritania
- Southwestern-most part of Mali
- The very westernmost part of Ivory Coast

In the Atlantic Ocean:

- Madeira (Portugal)
- Canary Islands (Spain)

In Europe:

- Most of Iceland, except the westernmost part, including northwest peninsula and main town of Ísafjörður (lies in "physical" time UTC-2)
- Most of Portugal west of 7.5ºW, except the easternmost part, including cities such as Bragança and Guarda (lies in "physical" UTC)
- The northeastern part of Greenland, including Danmarkshavn
- Ireland west of 7.5ºW, including the cities of Cork, Limerick, and Galway
- The westernmost tip of Northern Ireland, including the county town of County Fermanagh, Enniskillen
- The westernmost island of the Faroe Islands (autonomous region of the Danish Kingdom), Mykines
- The extreme westerly portion of the Outer Hebrides, in the west of Scotland; for instance, Vatersay, an inhabited island and the westernmost settlement of Great Britain, lies at 7°54'W. If uninhabited islands or rocks are taken into account St Kilda, west of the Outer Hebrides, at 8°58'W, and Rockall, at 13°41'W, should be included.

==== Using UTC+01:00 ====
In Europe:

- Parts of Galicia, Extremadura and Andalucia, Spain
- Jan Mayen, Norway
