= Mauritius Time =

Time zone

- Time zone
- Islands of the Republic of Mauritius (excluding Chagos Archipelago and Tromelin Island)

UTC offset
- MUT: UTC+04:00

Current time
- :: MUT [refresh]

Observance of DST
- DST is not observed in this time zone.

Time in Africa: Light Blue / Cape Verde Time^{[a]} (UTC−1); Blue / Greenwich Mean Time (UTC); Red / Central European Time; West Africa Time; (UTC+1); Yellow / Central Africa Time; Eastern European Time; South African Standard Time; (UTC+2); Ochre / Egypt Standard Time (UTC+2); Ochre / Egypt Summer Time (UTC+3); Green / East Africa Time (UTC+3); Turquoise / Mauritius Time^{[b]}; Seychelles Time^{[b]}; (UTC+4)^{a} The islands of Cape Verde are west of the African mainland.^{b} Mauritius and the Seychelles are east and northeast of Madagascar, respectively.

Mauritius Time (MUT) is a time zone used by the nation of Mauritius in the Indian Ocean. The zone is four hours ahead of UTC (UTC+04:00).

Mauritius does not use daylight saving time; however, it has been used in the past. Daylight saving time was first introduced in Mauritius in 1982; however, it was discontinued the following year. It was re-introduced in 2008; however, it was not used in 2009 or since. In 2008, the period started at 2 am UTC+5 (1 am UTC+4) on 26 October 2008 (the last Sunday in October), and ended at 2 am UTC+5 (1 am UTC+4) on 29 March 2009 (the last Sunday in March). Mauritius is in the Southern Hemisphere, so summer begins towards the end of the year.
