= Seychelles Time =

- Time zone

UTC offset
- SCT: UTC+04:00

Current time
- :: SCT [refresh]

Observance of DST
- DST is not observed in this time zone.

Time in Africa: Light Blue / Cape Verde Time^{[a]} (UTC−1); Blue / Greenwich Mean Time (UTC); Red / Central European Time; West Africa Time; (UTC+1); Yellow / Central Africa Time; Eastern European Time; South African Standard Time; (UTC+2); Ochre / Egypt Standard Time (UTC+2); Ochre / Egypt Summer Time (UTC+3); Green / East Africa Time (UTC+3); Turquoise / Mauritius Time^{[b]}; Seychelles Time^{[b]}; (UTC+4)^{a} The islands of Cape Verde are west of the African mainland.^{b} Mauritius and the Seychelles are east and northeast of Madagascar, respectively.

Seychelles Time (SCT) is a time zone used by the nation of Seychelles in the Indian Ocean. The zone is four hours ahead of UTC (UTC+04:00). Seychelles Time was first established by law in 1906, when Seychelles was a British colony.

Daylight saving time is not observed in SCT.

== See also ==
- Mauritius Time
