= UTC+02:00 =

Identifier for a time offset from UTC of +2

- Time zone
- World map with the time zone highlighted

UTC offset
- UTC: UTC+02:00

Current time
- 21:31, 7 September 2026 UTC+02:00 [refresh]

Central meridian
- 30 degrees E

Date-time group
- B

Time in Europe: Light Blue / Western European Time / Greenwich Mean Time (UTC); Blue / Western European Time / Greenwich Mean Time (UTC); Blue / Western European Summer Time / British Summer Time / Irish Standard Time (UTC+1); Red / Central European Time (UTC+1); Red / Central European Summer Time (UTC+2); Yellow / Eastern European Time / Kaliningrad Time (UTC+2); Ochre / Eastern European Time (UTC+2); Ochre / Eastern European Summer Time (UTC+3); Green / Moscow Time / Turkey Time (UTC+3); Turquoise / Armenia Time / Azerbaijan Time / Georgia Time / Samara Time (UTC+4); ▉▉▉▉ Pale hues: Standard time observed all year ▉▉▉ Dark hues: Daylight saving time

Time in Russia: KALT / Kaliningrad Time / UTC+2 / (MSK−1); MSK / Moscow Time / UTC+3 / (MSK±0); SAMT / Samara Time / UTC+4 / (MSK+1); YEKT / Yekaterinburg Time / UTC+5 / (MSK+2); OMST / Omsk Time / UTC+6 / (MSK+3); KRAT / Krasnoyarsk Time / UTC+7 / (MSK+4); IRKT / Irkutsk Time / UTC+8 / (MSK+5); YAKT / Yakutsk Time / UTC+9 / (MSK+6); VLAT / Vladivostok Time / UTC+10 / (MSK+7); MAGT / Magadan Time / UTC+11 / (MSK+8); PETT / Kamchatka Time / UTC+12 / (MSK+9)

Time in Africa: Light Blue / Cape Verde Time^{[a]} (UTC−1); Blue / Greenwich Mean Time (UTC); Red / Central European Time; West Africa Time; (UTC+1)^{[b]}; Yellow / Central Africa Time; Eastern European Time; South African Standard Time; (UTC+2); Ochre / Egypt Standard Time (UTC+2); Ochre / Egypt Summer Time (UTC+3); Green / East Africa Time (UTC+3); Turquoise / Mauritius Time^{[d]}; Seychelles Time^{[d]}; (UTC+4)^{a} The islands of Cape Verde lie west of the African mainland.^{b} In September 2026, Morocco will switch permanently to Greenwich Mean Time.^{d} Mauritius and the Seychelles lie to the east and northeast of Madagascar, respectively.

Time in the Middle East: Offset / Zone(s); UTC+2 / Eastern European Time; Israel Standard Time; Palestine Standard Time; UTC+3 / Eastern European Summer Time; Israel Summer Time; Palestine Summer Time; UTC+3 / Arabia Standard Time; Turkey Time; UTC+3:30 / Iran Standard Time; UTC+4 / Gulf Standard Time; Standard time observed all year Daylight saving time observed

UTC+02:00 is an identifier for a time offset from UTC of +02:00. In ISO 8601, the associated time would be written as 2020-11-08T23:41:45+02:00.

== As standard time (year-round) ==
Principal cities: Pretoria, Cape Town, Johannesburg, Durban, Port Elizabeth, Khartoum, Lubumbashi, Kigali, Gaborone, Bujumbura, Manzini, Maseru, Tripoli, Lilongwe, Maputo, Windhoek, Omdurman, Juba, Lusaka, Harare, Kaliningrad

=== Central Africa ===
- Botswana
- Burundi
- Democratic Republic of the Congo
  - The provinces of Bas-Uélé, Haut-Katanga, Haut-Lomami, Haut-Uélé, Kasaï, Kasaï Occidental, Kasaï Oriental, Katanga, Lomami, Lualaba, Maniema, Nord-Kivu, Orientale, Sankuru, Sud-Kivu, Tanganyika, Tshopo, and Ituri Interim Administration
- Eswatini
- Lesotho
- Libya
- Malawi
- Mozambique
- Namibia
- Rwanda
- South Africa (except Prince Edward Islands)
- South Sudan
- Sudan
- Zambia
- Zimbabwe

=== Europe ===
- Russia
  - Northwestern Federal District
    - Kaliningrad Oblast

== As standard time (Northern Hemisphere winter only) ==
Principal cities: Athens, Thessaloniki, Nicosia, North Nicosia, Helsinki, Turku, Mariehamn, Kyiv, Bucharest, Jerusalem, Tallinn, Sofia, Riga, Vilnius, Chișinău, Tiraspol, Lviv, Dnipro, Luhansk, Donetsk, Odesa, Kaunas, Klaipėda

=== Europe ===
==== Eastern Europe ====
Most countries observe European Union rule to remove DST.

- Bulgaria
- Cyprus
- Estonia
- Finland
  - Åland
- Greece
- Latvia
- Lithuania
- Moldova
- Romania
- Ukraine
  - Except Crimea (occupied by Russia), Luhansk and part of Donetsk regions
- United Kingdom
  - Akrotiri and Dhekelia

=== Asia ===
==== West Asia ====
Principal cities: Jerusalem, Beirut, Tel Aviv, Gaza, Bethlehem

- Israel
- Lebanon
- Palestine

=== Africa ===
==== North Africa ====
Principal cities: Cairo

- Egypt

== As daylight saving time (Northern Hemisphere summer only) ==
=== Europe ===
Principal cities: Berlin, Frankfurt, Munich, Hamburg, Cologne, Düsseldorf, Stuttgart, Leipzig, Dortmund, Essen, Bremen, Hanover, Mainz, Rome, Milan, Naples, Venice, Florence, Palermo, Turin, Genoa, Vatican City, San Marino, Paris, Marseille, Bordeaux, Nantes, Lyon, Lille, Montpellier, Toulouse, Strasbourg, Nice, Monaco, Madrid, Barcelona, Valencia, Seville, Málaga, Bilbao, Andorra, Vienna, Salzburg, Innsbruck, Zurich, Geneva, Bern, Brussels, Antwerp, Amsterdam, Rotterdam, Luxembourg, Valletta, Copenhagen, Stockholm, Oslo, Warsaw, Prague, Zagreb, Budapest, Tirana, Sarajevo, Pristina, Podgorica, Skopje, Belgrade, Bratislava, Ljubljana

- Albania
- Andorra
- Austria
- Belgium
- Bosnia and Herzegovina
- Croatia
- Czech Republic
- Denmark
- France
- Germany
- Gibraltar (British Overseas Territory)
- Hungary
- Italy
- Kosovo
- Liechtenstein
- Luxembourg
- Malta
- Monaco
- Montenegro
- Netherlands
- North Macedonia
- Norway (including Svalbard and Jan Mayen)
- Poland
- San Marino
- Serbia
- Slovakia
- Slovenia
- Spain (Excluding Canary Islands)
- Sweden
- Switzerland
- Vatican City

== Discrepancies between official UTC+02:00 and geographical UTC+02:00 ==
=== Areas in UTC+02:00 longitudes using other time zones ===
Using UTC+03:00:

- Tanzania
  - The western part, including Mwanza and Mbeya
- Uganda
- Kenya
  - The western part, including nation's capital Nairobi
- Ethiopia
  - The western part, including Nekemte and Jimma
- Saudi Arabia
  - The northwesternmost part, including Tabuk
- Turkey
  - Most part in the country, including nation's capital Ankara and largest city Istanbul
- Ukraine
  - Part of Donetsk and Luhansk regions, Crimea
- Belarus
- Russia
  - The western part, including Saint Petersburg, half of Moscow

Using UTC+01:00:

- North Macedonia (standard time)
  - The easternmost part, including Novo Selo and Berovo
- Serbia (standard time)
  - The very easternmost part, including Pirot
- Hungary (standard time)
  - The northeasternmost part of Szabolcs-Szatmár-Bereg
- Slovakia (standard time)
  - The easternmost part of Prešov Region
- Poland (standard time)
  - The easternmost part, including Białystok
- Norway (standard time)
  - Most part of Finnmark
  - The easternmost part of Svalbard
- Chad
  - The westernmost part of Ennedi-Est, including Amdjarass
- Democratic Republic of the Congo
  - The easternmost part of its provinces:
    - Nord-Ubangi
    - Mongala
    - Tshuapa
    - Kasaï Province
- Angola
  - The westernmost part of Moxico Province
- Central African Republic
  - Haut-Mbomou
  - The western part of its prefectures:
    - Mbomou
    - Haute-Kotto
    - Vakaga

=== Areas outside UTC+02:00 longitudes using UTC+02:00 time ===
==== Areas between 7°30' E and 22°30' E ("physical" UTC+01:00) ====
From south to north:

- South Africa
  - The westernmost part, including Cape Town
- Botswana
  - The western part of the districts:
    - Kgalagadi
    - Ghanzi
    - Ngamiland
- Democratic Republic of the Congo
  - The very westernmost part of Lualaba Province, Kasaï-Central and Sankuru
- Libya
  - The most part in the country, where the nation's capital Tripoli is
- Greece (standard time)
  - The western part, including Patras and Ioanina
- Romania (standard time)
  - The westernmost part, including Timişoara
- Russia
  - Kaliningrad Oblast
- Lithuania (standard time)
  - The westernmost part, including Klaipėda
- Latvia (standard time)
  - The westernmost part, including Liepāja
- Estonia (standard time)
  - The westernmost parts of the Saare and Hiiu counties.
- Finland (standard time)
  - The westernmost part, including Turku
