= List of time zone abbreviations =

This is a list of time zone abbreviations.

Time zones are often represented by alphabetic abbreviations such as "EST", "WST", and "CST", but these are not part of the international time and date standard ISO 8601 and their use as sole designator for a time zone is discouraged.

Such designations can be ambiguous; for example, "CST" can mean China Standard Time (UTC+08:00), Cuba Standard Time (UTC−05:00), and (North American) Central Standard Time (UTC−06:00), and it is also a widely used variant of ACST (Australian Central Standard Time, UTC+9:30). Such designations predate both ISO 8601 and the internet era; in an earlier era, they were sufficiently unambiguous for many practical uses within a national context (for example, in railway timetables and business correspondence), but their ambiguity explains their deprecation in the internet era, when communications more often cannot rely on implicit geographic context to supply part of the meaning.

Abbr.	Name	UTC offset
ACDT	Australian Central Daylight Saving Time	UTC+10:30
ACST	Australian Central Standard Time	UTC+09:30
ACT	Acre Time	UTC−05:00
ACT	ASEAN Common Time (proposed)	UTC+08:00
ACWST	Australian Central Western Standard Time (unofficial)	UTC+08:45
ADT	Atlantic Daylight Time	UTC−03:00
AEDT	Australian Eastern Daylight Saving Time	UTC+11:00
AEST	Australian Eastern Standard Time	UTC+10:00
AET (AEST/AEDT)	Australian Eastern Time	UTC+10:00 / UTC+11:00
AFT	Afghanistan Time	UTC+04:30
AKDT	Alaska Daylight Time	UTC−08:00
AKST	Alaska Standard Time	UTC−09:00
ALMT	Alma-Ata Time	UTC+06:00
AMST	Amazon Summer Time (Brazil)	UTC−03:00
AMT	Amazon Time (Brazil)	UTC−04:00
AMT	Armenia Time	UTC+04:00
ANAT	Anadyr Time	UTC+12:00
AQTT	Aqtobe Time	UTC+05:00
ART	Argentina Time	UTC−03:00
AST	Arabia Standard Time	UTC+03:00
AST	Atlantic Standard Time	UTC−04:00
AWST	Australian Western Standard Time	UTC+08:00
AZOST	Azores Summer Time	UTC+00:00
AZOT	Azores Standard Time	UTC−01:00
AZT	Azerbaijan Time	UTC+04:00
BNT	Brunei Time	UTC+08:00
BIOT	British Indian Ocean Time	UTC+06:00
BIT	Baker Island Time	UTC−12:00
BOT	Bolivia Time	UTC−04:00
BRST	Brasília Summer Time	UTC−02:00
BRT	Brasília Time	UTC−03:00
BST	Bangladesh Standard Time	UTC+06:00
BST	Bougainville Standard Time	UTC+11:00
BST	British Summer Time (British Standard Time from Mar 1968 to Oct 1971)	UTC+01:00
BTT	Bhutan Time	UTC+06:00
CAT	Central Africa Time	UTC+02:00
CCT	Cocos Islands Time	UTC+06:30
CDT	Central Daylight Time (North America)	UTC−05:00
CDT	Cuba Daylight Time	UTC−04:00
CEST	Central European Summer Time	UTC+02:00
CET	Central European Time	UTC+01:00
CHADT	Chatham Daylight Time	UTC+13:45
CHAST	Chatham Standard Time	UTC+12:45
CHOT	Choibalsan Standard Time	UTC+08:00
CHOST	Choibalsan Summer Time	UTC+09:00
CHST	Chamorro Standard Time	UTC+10:00
CHUT	Chuuk Time	UTC+10:00
CIST	Clipperton Island Standard Time	UTC−08:00
CKT	Cook Island Time	UTC−10:00
CLST	Chile Summer Time	UTC−03:00
CLT	Chile Standard Time	UTC−04:00
COST	Colombia Summer Time	UTC−04:00
COT	Colombia Time	UTC−05:00
CST	Central Standard Time (Central America)	UTC−06:00
CST	Central Standard Time (North America)	UTC−06:00
CST	China Standard Time	UTC+08:00
CST	Cuba Standard Time	UTC−05:00
CT (CST/CDT)	Central Time	UTC−06:00 / UTC−05:00
CVT	Cape Verde Time	UTC−01:00
CWST	Central Western Standard Time (Australia) unofficial	UTC+08:45
CXT	Christmas Island Time	UTC+07:00
DAVT	Davis Time	UTC+07:00
DDUT	Dumont d'Urville Time (in French Antarctic station)	UTC+10:00
DFT	AIX-specific equivalent of Central European Time (Note: AIX OS uses this abbreviation as an equivalent of CET)	UTC+01:00
EASST	Easter Island Summer Time	UTC−05:00
EAST	Easter Island Standard Time	UTC−06:00
EAT	East Africa Time	UTC+03:00
ECT	Eastern Caribbean Time (does not recognise DST)	UTC−04:00
ECT	Ecuador Time	UTC−05:00
EDT	Eastern Daylight Time (North America)	UTC−04:00
EEST	Eastern European Summer Time	UTC+03:00
EET	Eastern European Time	UTC+02:00
EGST	Eastern Greenland Summer Time	UTC+00:00
EGT	Eastern Greenland Time	UTC−01:00
EST	Eastern Standard Time (North America)	UTC−05:00
ET (EST/EDT)	Eastern Time (North America)	UTC−05:00 / UTC−04:00
FET	Further-eastern European Time	UTC+03:00
FJT	Fiji Time	UTC+12:00
FKST	Falkland Islands Summer Time	UTC−03:00
FKT	Falkland Islands Time	UTC−04:00
FNT	Fernando de Noronha Time	UTC−02:00
GALT	Galápagos Time	UTC−06:00
GAMT	Gambier Islands Time	UTC−09:00
GET	Georgia Standard Time	UTC+04:00
GFT	French Guiana Time	UTC−03:00
GILT	Gilbert Island Time	UTC+12:00
GIT	Gambier Island Time	UTC−09:00
GMT	Greenwich Mean Time	UTC+00:00
GST	South Georgia and the South Sandwich Islands Time	UTC−02:00
GST	Gulf Standard Time	UTC+04:00
GYT	Guyana Time	UTC−04:00
HDT	Hawaii–Aleutian Daylight Time	UTC−09:00
HAEC	Heure Avancée d'Europe Centrale French-language name for CEST	UTC+02:00
HST	Hawaii–Aleutian Standard Time	UTC−10:00
HKT	Hong Kong Time	UTC+08:00
HMT	Heard and McDonald Islands Time	UTC+05:00
HOVST	Hovd Summer Time (not used from 2017–present)	UTC+08:00
HOVT	Hovd Time	UTC+07:00
ICT	Indochina Time	UTC+07:00
IDLW	International Date Line West time zone	UTC−12:00
IDT	Israel Daylight Time	UTC+03:00
IOT	Indian Ocean Time	UTC+06:00
IRDT	Iran Daylight Time	UTC+04:30
IRKT	Irkutsk Time	UTC+08:00
IRST	Iran Standard Time	UTC+03:30
IST	Indian Standard Time	UTC+05:30
IST	Irish Standard Time	UTC+01:00
IST	Israel Standard Time	UTC+02:00
JST	Japan Standard Time	UTC+09:00
KALT	Kaliningrad Time	UTC+02:00
KGT	Kyrgyzstan Time	UTC+06:00
KOST	Kosrae Time	UTC+11:00
KRAT	Krasnoyarsk Time	UTC+07:00
KST	Korea Standard Time	UTC+09:00
LHST	Lord Howe Standard Time	UTC+10:30
LHST	Lord Howe Summer Time	UTC+11:00
LINT	Line Islands Time	UTC+14:00
MAGT	Magadan Time	UTC+12:00
MART	Marquesas Islands Time	UTC−09:30
MAWT	Mawson Station Time	UTC+05:00
MDT	Mountain Daylight Time (North America)	UTC−06:00
MET	Middle European Time (same zone as CET)	UTC+01:00
MEST	Middle European Summer Time (same zone as CEST)	UTC+02:00
MHT	Marshall Islands Time	UTC+12:00
MIST	Macquarie Island Station Time	UTC+11:00
MIT	Marquesas Islands Time	UTC−09:30
MMT	Myanmar Standard Time	UTC+06:30
MSK	Moscow Time	UTC+03:00
MST	Malaysian Standard Time	UTC+08:00
MST	Mountain Standard Time (North America)	UTC−07:00
MT (MST/MDT)	Mountain Time (North America)	UTC−07:00 / UTC−06:00
MUT	Mauritius Time	UTC+04:00
MVT	Maldives Time	UTC+05:00
MYT	Malaysia Time	UTC+08:00
NCT	New Caledonia Time	UTC+11:00
NDT	Newfoundland Daylight Time	UTC−02:30
NFT	Norfolk Island Time	UTC+11:00
NOVT	Novosibirsk Time	UTC+07:00
NPT	Nepal Time	UTC+05:45
NST	Newfoundland Standard Time	UTC−03:30
NT	Newfoundland Time	UTC−03:30
NUT	Niue Time	UTC−11:00
NZDT	New Zealand Daylight Time	UTC+13:00
NZDST	New Zealand Daylight Saving Time	UTC+13:00
NZST	New Zealand Standard Time	UTC+12:00
OMST	Omsk Time	UTC+06:00
ORAT	Oral Time	UTC+05:00
PCT	British Columbia Time (Canada)	UTC−07:00
PDT	Pacific Daylight Time (North America)	UTC−07:00
PET	Peru Time	UTC−05:00
PETT	Kamchatka Time	UTC+12:00
PGT	Papua New Guinea Time	UTC+10:00
PHOT	Phoenix Island Time	UTC+13:00
PHT	Philippine Time	UTC+08:00
PHST	Philippine Standard Time	UTC+08:00
PKT	Pakistan Standard Time	UTC+05:00
PMDT	Saint Pierre and Miquelon Daylight Time	UTC−02:00
PMST	Saint Pierre and Miquelon Standard Time	UTC−03:00
PONT	Pohnpei Standard Time	UTC+11:00
PST	Pacific Standard Time (North America)	UTC−08:00
PT (PST/PDT)	Pacific Time (North America)	UTC−08:00 / UTC−07:00
PWT	Palau Time	UTC+09:00
PYST	Paraguay Summer Time	UTC−03:00
PYT	Paraguay Time	UTC−04:00
RET	Réunion Time	UTC+04:00
ROTT	Rothera Research Station Time	UTC−03:00
SAKT	Sakhalin Island Time	UTC+11:00
SAMT	Samara Time	UTC+04:00
SAST	South African Standard Time	UTC+02:00
SBT	Solomon Islands Time	UTC+11:00
SCT	Seychelles Time	UTC+04:00
SDT	Samoa Daylight Time	UTC−10:00
SGT	Singapore Time	UTC+08:00
SLST	Sri Lanka Standard Time	UTC+05:30
SRET	Srednekolymsk Time	UTC+11:00
SRT	Suriname Time	UTC−03:00
SST	Samoa Standard Time	UTC−11:00
SYOT	Showa Station Time	UTC+03:00
TAHT	Tahiti Time	UTC−10:00
THA	Thailand Standard Time	UTC+07:00
TFT	French Southern and Antarctic Time	UTC+05:00
TJT	Tajikistan Time	UTC+05:00
TKT	Tokelau Time	UTC+13:00
TLT	Timor Leste Time	UTC+09:00
TMT	Turkmenistan Time	UTC+05:00
TRT	Turkey Time	UTC+03:00
TOT	Tonga Time	UTC+13:00
TST	Taiwan Standard Time	UTC+08:00
TVT	Tuvalu Time	UTC+12:00
ULAST	Ulaanbaatar Summer Time	UTC+09:00
ULAT	Ulaanbaatar Standard Time	UTC+08:00
UTC	Coordinated Universal Time	UTC+00:00
UYST	Uruguay Summer Time	UTC−02:00
UYT	Uruguay Standard Time	UTC−03:00
UZT	Uzbekistan Time	UTC+05:00
VET	Venezuelan Standard Time	UTC−04:00
VLAT	Vladivostok Time	UTC+10:00
VOLT	Volgograd Time	UTC+03:00
VOST	Vostok Station Time	UTC+06:00
VUT	Vanuatu Time	UTC+11:00
WAKT	Wake Island Time	UTC+12:00
WAST	West Africa Summer Time	UTC+02:00
WAT	West Africa Time	UTC+01:00
WEST	Western European Summer Time	UTC+01:00
WET	Western European Time	UTC+00:00
WIB	Western Indonesian Time	UTC+07:00
WIT	Eastern Indonesian Time	UTC+09:00
WITA	Central Indonesia Time	UTC+08:00
WGST	West Greenland Summer Time	UTC−02:00
WGT	West Greenland Time	UTC−03:00
WST	Western Standard Time	UTC+08:00
YAKT	Yakutsk Time	UTC+09:00
YEKT	Yekaterinburg Time	UTC+05:00

== See also ==
- List of tz database time zones
- Military time zone
- Lists of time zones
- Abolition of time zones
