= List of time offsets by U.S. state and territory =

Map of U.S. time zones with new CST and EST areas displayed. Some U.S. time zones, such as the Samoa Time Zone, are not on this map.

This is a list of the time offsets by U.S. states, federal district, and territories. For more about the time zones of the U.S. see time in the United States.

Most states are located entirely within one time zone. However, some states are located in two time zones for geographic, socio-political, or economic reasons.

== States, federal district and territories ==
State federal district or territory	Time Offsets	DST	Details	Map
Alabama	UTC−06:00 CT	Yes	Central Standard Time (Phenix City observes Eastern time on a de facto basis)	
Alaska	UTC−09:00 AKT	Yes	Most of state: UTC−09:00 AKST Alaska Standard Time	
Alaska	UTC−10:00 HT	Yes	Aleutian Islands (west of 169°30' W): UTC−10:00 HST Hawaii–Aleutian Standard Time	
American Samoa	UTC−11:00 ST	No	Samoa Standard Time	
Arizona	UTC−07:00 MT	Part	Mountain Standard Time. Except for the Navajo Nation, Arizona does not observe DST.	
Arkansas	UTC−06:00 CT	Yes	Central	
California	UTC−08:00 PT	Yes	Pacific Standard Time	
Colorado	UTC−07:00 MT	Yes	Mountain	
Connecticut	UTC−05:00 ET	Yes	Eastern Standard Time	
Delaware	UTC−05:00 ET	Yes	Eastern	
District of Columbia	UTC−05:00 ET	Yes	Eastern	
Florida	UTC−05:00 ET	Yes	Big Bend and peninsula regions east of the Apalachicola River along with the portion of Gulf County south of the Intracoastal Waterway: UTC−05:00 EST Eastern Standard Time	
Florida	UTC−06:00 CT	Yes	Florida Panhandle West of the Apalachicola River except for the portion of Gulf County south of the Intracoastal Waterway: UTC−06:00 CST Central Standard Time	
(Georgia (U.S. state)) Georgia	UTC−05:00 ET	Yes	Eastern	
Guam	UTC+10:00 ChT	No	Chamorro Standard Time	
Hawaii	UTC−10:00 HT	No	Hawaii–Aleutian	
Idaho	UTC−07:00 MT	Yes	Most of state: UTC−07:00 MST Mountain Standard Time (A legislative error in 1923 in the Calder Act seemingly put this area at UTC−06:00 CST, and was corrected by Congress in 2007.) 15 U.S.C. ch. 6, § 264. MST has been observed since 1923.	
Idaho	UTC−08:00 PT	Yes	North of the Salmon River, that is between the Oregon state border and the Idaho County/Lemhi County border; west of the Idaho County/Lemhi County border, that is between the Salmon River and the Montana state border: UTC−08:00 PST Pacific Standard Time	
Illinois	UTC−06:00 CT	Yes	Central	
Indiana	UTC−05:00 ET	Yes	Most of state: UTC−05:00 EST Eastern Standard Time	
Indiana	UTC−06:00 CT	Yes	Northwest and southwest corners: UTC−06:00 CST Central Standard Time (See Time in Indiana for more information)	
Iowa	UTC−06:00 CT	Yes	Central	
Kansas	UTC−06:00 CT	Yes	Most of state: UTC−06:00 CST Central Standard Time	
Kansas	UTC−07:00 MT	Yes	Greeley, Hamilton, Sherman and Wallace counties: UTC−07:00 MST Mountain Standard Time	
Kentucky	UTC−05:00 ET	Yes	Eastern 60% of state: UTC−05:00 EST Eastern Standard Time	
Kentucky	UTC−06:00 CT	Yes	Western 40% of state: UTC−06:00 CST Central Standard Time	
Louisiana	UTC−06:00 CT	Yes	Central	
Maine	UTC−05:00 ET	Yes	Eastern	
Maryland	UTC−05:00 ET	Yes	Eastern	
Massachusetts	UTC−05:00 ET	Yes	Eastern	
Michigan	UTC−05:00 ET	Yes	Most of state: UTC−05:00 EST Eastern Standard Time	
Michigan	UTC−06:00 CT	Yes	Upper Peninsula counties bordering Wisconsin: UTC−06:00 CST Central Standard Time	
Minnesota	UTC−06:00 CT	Yes	Central	
Mississippi	UTC−06:00 CT	Yes	Central	
Missouri	UTC−06:00 CT	Yes	Central	
Montana	UTC−07:00 MT	Yes	Mountain	
Nebraska	UTC−06:00 CT	Yes	Most of state: UTC−06:00 CST Central Standard Time	
Nebraska	UTC−07:00 MT	Yes	Nebraska Panhandle, counties with Colorado as a western boundary, and the western Sand Hills: UTC−07:00 MST Mountain Standard Time	
Nevada	UTC−07:00 MT	Yes	West Wendover city limits: UTC−07:00 MST Mountain Standard Time	
Nevada	UTC−08:00 PT	Yes	Most of state: UTC−08:00 PST Pacific Standard Time	
New Hampshire	UTC−05:00 ET	Yes	Eastern	
New Jersey	UTC−05:00 ET	Yes	Eastern	
New Mexico	UTC−07:00 MT	Yes	Mountain	
(New York (state)) New York	UTC−05:00 ET	Yes	Eastern	
North Carolina	UTC−05:00 ET	Yes	Eastern	
North Dakota	UTC−06:00 CT	Yes	Most of state: UTC−06:00 CST Central Standard Time	
North Dakota	UTC−07:00 MT	Yes	West of the Missouri River (except Morton and Oliver counties, and parts of Dunn, McKenzie, and Sioux counties: UTC−07:00 MST Mountain Standard Time	
Northern Mariana Islands	UTC+10:00 ChT	No	Chamorro	
Ohio	UTC−05:00 ET	Yes	Eastern	
Oklahoma	UTC−06:00 CT	Yes	Central (Kenton observes Mountain time on a de facto basis)	
Oregon	UTC−07:00 MT	Yes	Northern 80% of Malheur County: UTC−07:00 MST Mountain Standard Time	
Oregon	UTC−08:00 PT	Yes	Most of state: UTC−08:00 PST Pacific Standard Time	
Pennsylvania	UTC−05:00 ET	Yes	Eastern	
Puerto Rico	UTC−04:00 AT	No	Atlantic Standard Time	
Rhode Island	UTC−05:00 ET	Yes	Eastern	
South Carolina	UTC−05:00 ET	Yes	Eastern	
South Dakota	UTC−06:00 CT	Yes	Eastern half of state: UTC−06:00 CST Central Standard Time	
South Dakota	UTC−07:00 MT	Yes	Western half of state: UTC−07:00 MST Mountain Standard Time	
Tennessee	UTC−05:00 ET	Yes	East Tennessee, except Bledsoe, Cumberland, and Marion Counties: UTC−05:00 EST Eastern Standard Time	
Tennessee	UTC−06:00 CT	Yes	Most of state: UTC−06:00 CST Central Standard Time	
Texas	UTC−06:00 CT	Yes	Most of state: UTC−06:00 CST Central Standard Time	
Texas	UTC−07:00 MT	Yes	El Paso and Hudspeth counties: UTC−07:00 MST Mountain Standard Time	
(United States) U.S. Minor Outlying Islands	UTC+12:00; UTC−12:00; UTC−11:00 ST; UTC−10:00 HT; UTC−05:00 ET	No	Wake Island: UTC+12:00 (Wake Island Time Zone); Baker Island and Howland Island: UTC−12:00; Jarvis Island, Kingman Reef, Midway Atoll, and Palmyra Atoll: UTC−11:00 (Samoa Time); Johnston Atoll: UTC−10:00 (Hawaii–Aleutian Time)	
Utah	UTC−07:00 MT	Yes	Mountain	
Vermont	UTC−05:00 ET	Yes	Eastern	
(United States Virgin Islands) U.S. Virgin Islands	UTC−04:00 AT	No	Atlantic	
Virginia	UTC−05:00 ET	Yes	Eastern	
(Washington (state)) Washington	UTC−08:00 PT	Yes	Pacific	
West Virginia	UTC−05:00 ET	Yes	Eastern	
Wisconsin	UTC−06:00 CT	Yes	Central	
Wyoming	UTC−07:00 MT	Yes	Mountain	

== See also ==
- History of time in the United States
- List of time zones
- Time in the United States
