= Time in Indiana =

Time zones used in Indiana

Location of the state of Indiana in the United States, highlighted in red.

The U.S. state of Indiana is divided into Eastern and Central time zones.

== History ==
From the beginning of standardized time zones in 1918 until 1961, all of Indiana was in the Central Time Zone, with the boundary running along the Indiana–Ohio border. The Interstate Commerce Commission shifted the line to run roughly halfway through the state in 1961, although many counties in the western part of the state unofficially began to use Eastern Time to be on the same time as Indianapolis. In 1966, Eastern Time was extended to all of Indiana except for the northwestern counties, which were suburbs of Chicago, and the southwestern counties surrounding Evansville, which historically had stronger railroad ties to Nashville, Memphis, and St. Louis than to Indianapolis. These changes were said to have primarily occurred to ease communications between Indiana and New York City.

As much of Indiana is on the western frontier of the Eastern Time Zone, many in the state opposed observing daylight saving time (DST) there for decades. In 1972, a plan was implemented where DST was observed in the Central Time counties but not the Eastern Time counties. Due to a 2005 law passed by the Indiana General Assembly, DST was observed statewide beginning in April 2006, with five southwestern and northwestern counties reverting to Central Time.

== Time zones ==
Time in Indiana Counties grouped by time zone. Lake Michigan shown in blue at top left.: / Standard / DST / US time zone; Red / UTC−06:00 / UTC−05:00 / Central Time; Yellow / UTC−05:00 / UTC−04:00 / Eastern Time

Indiana observes Eastern Time in 80 of its 92 counties. The remaining 12 counties observe Central Time. Six of these counties are in northwestern Indiana, near Chicago (which observes Central Time), and six are in southwestern Indiana, near Evansville, whose metro area includes portions of southeastern Illinois and western Kentucky, which also observe Central Time. The 12 counties are:

- Northwestern Indiana (Chicagoland):
  - Jasper
  - Lake
  - LaPorte
  - Newton
  - Porter
  - Starke
- Southwestern Indiana (Evansville Metro Area):
  - Gibson
  - Perry
  - Posey
  - Spencer
  - Vanderburgh
  - Warrick

Since April 2, 2006, all counties in Indiana observe daylight saving time.

== tz database ==
Counties grouped by zones as defined in the tz database

The tz database lists 11 time zones for Indiana, where each zone is defined as a geographic area that observed the same offsets from UTC since January 1, 1970 (the UNIX epoch). The diagrams in this article are colored to show these 11 zones and a key is provided below. Indiana is covered by the following zones in the tz database. Columns marked with * contain the data from zone.tab.

c.c.*	coordinates*	TZ*	comments*	UTC offset	DST	Location and counties within Indiana	Notes
US	+394606−0860929	America/Indiana/Indianapolis	Eastern – IN (most areas)	−05:00	−04:00	East of the 1961 divide: (all unlisted counties); West of the 1961 divide: N: Saint Joseph, Marshall, Fulton, Cass, Miami, Howard, Tipton; NW: Benton, Warren, White, Tippecanoe, Carroll, Clinton; W: Montgomery, Fountain, Parke, Vigo, Clay, Sullivan, Greene, Owen, Vermillion, Putnam; S: Monroe, Brown, Bartholomew, Lawrence, Jackson, Orange, Washington	
US	+410305−0863611	America/Indiana/Winamac	Eastern – IN (Pulaski)	−05:00	−04:00	North West: Pulaski	
US	+382931−0871643	America/Indiana/Petersburg	Eastern – IN (Pike)	−05:00	−04:00	South West: Pike	
US	+384038−0873143	America/Indiana/Vincennes	Eastern – IN (Da, Du, K, Mn)	−05:00	−04:00	South West: Daviess, Dubois, Knox, Martin	
US	+382232−0862041	America/Indiana/Marengo	Eastern – IN (Crawford)	−05:00	−04:00	South West: Crawford	
US	+381515−0854534	America/Kentucky/Louisville	Eastern – KY (Louisville area)	−05:00	−04:00	South East: Clark, Floyd, Harrison	only part of the zone is in Indiana
US	+384452−0850402	America/Indiana/Vevay	Eastern – IN (Switzerland)	−05:00	−04:00	South East: Switzerland	
US	+404251−0740023	America/New_York	Eastern (most areas)	−05:00	−04:00	South East: Dearborn, Ohio	only part of the zone is in Indiana
US	+415100−0873900	America/Chicago	Central (most areas)	−06:00	−05:00	North West, near Chicago: Jasper, Lake, LaPorte, Newton, Porter; South West, near Evansville: Gibson, Posey, Spencer, Vanderburgh, and Warrick	only part of the zone is in Indiana
US	+411745−0863730	America/Indiana/Knox	Central – IN (Starke)	−06:00	−05:00	North West: Starke	
US	+375711−0864541	America/Indiana/Tell_City	Central – IN (Perry)	−06:00	−05:00	South West: Perry	

== History ==
The most extensive study of time zone history in Indiana was published in The American Atlas (1978) by Thomas G. Shanks, in which the author identified 345 areas in the state with a different time zone history for each.

=== Pre-1918 ===
Before 1883 in the United States, most towns and cities set their own local time to noon when the sun was at its highest point in the sky. Since the sun reaches "high noon" four minutes later for every degree of longitude traveled towards the west, the time in every town was different. In Indiana, local mean time varied from GMT-5:39 in the east to GMT-5:52 in the west. With the emergence of the railroads, hundreds of miles could be traveled in a much shorter time, causing a train passenger to apparently experience several slight changes in time over the course of even a short rail trip. By 1883, the major railroads in the US agreed to coordinate their clocks and begin operating on "standard time" with four "time zones" established across the (then 38-state) nation, centered on the 75th, 90th, 105th, and 120th meridians west. On November 18, 1883, telegraph lines transmitted GMT to major cities, where each city was to adjust their official time to their proper zone. The state capital in Indianapolis lies at approximately the 86th meridian (U.S. Census Bureau), closer to the center of the Central Time Zone at the 90th meridian than the center of the Eastern Time Zone at the 75th meridian. Mean solar time in Indiana is approximately GMT-5:45.

=== 1918 to 1948 ===
1918–1961. The Standard Time Act of 1918 placed Indiana in the Central Time Zone. However, some communities chose to observe Eastern Time. Some communities observed DST.

Time zones were first adopted by the United States Congress with the Standard Time Act of 1918. All of Indiana was located in the Central Time Zone. It was at this time the dividing line between Eastern Time and Central Time was moved from the Pennsylvania-Ohio and West Virginia-Ohio state lines. The Ohio-Indiana state line became the time zone line in 1927 (north of US Route 40) and 1935 (from US Route 40 to the Ohio River). Daylight saving time (DST) was included in the original Standard Time Act. A year later, Congress repealed daylight saving time from the Standard Time Act of 1918, though some communities continued to follow it. During World War II, daylight saving time was once again mandated by Congress to conserve energy. After the war, the mandate to observe daylight saving time was lifted again.

=== 1949 to 1959 ===
In 1949, in a heated rural vs. city debate, the Indiana General Assembly passed a law to put all of Indiana on Central Standard Time and to outlaw daylight saving time. However, the law had no enforcement power, and it was largely ignored by communities that wanted to observe Eastern Standard Time. The General Assembly passed a law to make Central Time the official time zone of the state in 1957, but permitted any community to switch to daylight saving time during the summer. The law did, however, make it illegal for communities to observe "fast time" (i.e., daylight saving time) during the winter months. Governor Harold W. Handley vowed to enforce the law by withdrawing state aid from communities that attempted to observe "fast time" during the winter, though legal obstacles forced the governor to back down from his stance. Once again, the law was not enforceable, and individual communities continued to observe whichever time zone they preferred.

=== 1960 to 1977 ===
1961–1967. In 1961, The Interstate Commerce Commission divided Indiana between the Eastern and Central Time Zones. The new time zone line was never uniformly observed.

From 1967 to 1977, six counties in the northwest near Chicago and six southwest counties in and around Evansville, observed DST in the Central Time Zone. The other 82 counties were in the Eastern Time Zone and did not observe DST; however, six counties near Louisville, Kentucky; and Cincinnati, unofficially observed DST.

In 1961, the legislature repealed the 1957 law making Central Time the official time of Indiana, which allowed any community to observe DST. The Interstate Commerce Commission divided Indiana between the Central Time Zone and the Eastern Time Zone. This made more of the Michigan-Indiana (first changed in 1931) and Kentucky-Indiana (first changed in 1935 and additionally in 1957) state lines the time zone boundaries. Neither the time zone line nor daylight saving time were uniformly observed. The United States Congress later passed the Uniform Time Act of 1966 to specify where and when daylight saving time was applied in the U.S., and authority was shifted to the United States Department of Transportation (USDOT). Prior to the passing of this law, each state was permitted to decide this issue for itself. Having the state split in two time zones was inconvenient, however, so Governor Roger D. Branigin petitioned the USDOT to place all of Indiana back in the Central Time Zone a year later.

Over the next two years, the USDOT conducted several hearings in response to Branigin's petition. Citizens of northwest and southwest Indiana appeared to favor the Central Time Zone with observance of DST, while those from other areas of the state favored the Eastern Time Zone with no observance of DST. The USDOT chose to divide Indiana between the Central Time Zone and the Eastern Time Zone. Six counties near Chicago (Lake, Porter, LaPorte, Jasper, Newton, and Starke) and six counties near Evansville (Posey, Vanderburgh, Warrick, Spencer, Gibson, and Pike) were placed in the Central Time Zone with observance of DST. The remainder of the state was placed in the Eastern Time Zone; the state was given special dispensation to exempt parts of itself from DST. Most portions of the state that were in the Eastern Time Zone did not observe DST. However, Floyd, Clark, and Harrison counties, which are near Louisville, Kentucky, and Dearborn and Ohio counties, which are near Cincinnati, Ohio, unofficially observed DST due to their proximity to those major cities that observed DST.

While the USDOT was considering where the time zone line should be, several broadcast companies filed a federal lawsuit in 1968 to compel the USDOT to enforce the observance of daylight saving time in Indiana, which they won. As a result, the USDOT was ordered to stop informing Indiana residents that the Uniform Time Act would not be enforced and to provide a plan for its enforcement in Time Life Broadcast Company, Inc. v. Boyd, Time Life being the owner of WFBM-TV (Channel 6) in Indianapolis.

In 1972, the Indiana General Assembly overrode a veto from Governor Edgar Whitcomb to place the northwest and southwest corners of Indiana in the Central Time Zone on daylight saving time, and to place the rest of the state on Eastern Standard Time, upon federal approval. Congress approved an amendment to the Uniform Time Act of 1966 to permit a state that lay in two time zones to exempt part of the state from daylight saving time, and President Richard Nixon signed it into law. The final changes to the Michigan-Indiana time zone boundary occurred in 1973, when Michigan (also affected by the 1972 amendments to the Uniform time act) adopted its current daylight saving and time zone boundary laws. Several eastern Indiana counties (Ohio and Dearborn counties, near Cincinnati; and Floyd, Clark, and Harrison counties, near Louisville) chose to unofficially observe daylight saving time, despite the Indiana statute.

=== County petitions (1977 to 1991) ===
1977–1991. In 1977, Pike County in the southwest moved from Central Time to Eastern Time, and did not observe DST.

1991–2006. In 1991, Starke County in the northwest received approval to move to Eastern Time, and did not observe DST.

Starting in 1977, several counties and the state began petitioning USDOT to switch time zones and Daylight Savings Time observance.

Pike County asked the USDOT to move it from the Central Time Zone to the Eastern Time Zone in 1977; the request was approved. Four years later, Starke County asked the USDOT to move it from the Central Time Zone to the Eastern Time Zone; in this case, however the USDOT did not find a sound reason for the move, and declined the request (see 46 FR 23500 and 46 FR 51786). In 1985, the Indiana General Assembly, in Senate Concurrent Resolution 6, asked the USDOT to move five counties in southwest Indiana (Posey, Vanderburgh, Warrick, Spencer, and Gibson) from the Central Time Zone to the Eastern Time Zone. The USDOT denied the request, finding that the change would not serve the convenience of commerce (see 50 FR 25856, 50 FR 28959, and 50 FR 43745). By 1986–87, Jasper County, along with Starke County, which was making a time zone change request for the second time in four years, petitioned the USDOT to move them from the Central Time Zone to the Eastern Time Zone in 1987–1989. Those petitions of the counties were denied (see 51 FR 43644 and 52 FR 10119).

Attitudes began to change in the 1990s, as Indiana's time zone situation was seen as impeding the state's economic growth. Interstate travel and commerce were difficult as people wondered, "what time is it in Indiana?" In 1991, Starke County petitioned the USDOT to move it from the Central Time Zone to the Eastern Time Zone for the third time. This time, the petition was granted, effective October 27, 1991 (see 56 FR 13609 and 56 FR 51997).

=== Switch to statewide DST ===
2006–March 2007. On April 2, 2006, two northwestern counties (Starke and Pulaski) and six in the southwest (Knox, Daviess, Martin, Pike, Dubois, and Perry) returned from Eastern Time to Central Time, and the entire state officially observed DST.

March 2007, to November 2007. On March 11, 2007, Pulaski County in the northwest returned to Eastern Time.

On November 4, 2007, five southwestern counties (Knox, Daviess, Martin, Pike, and Dubois) returned to Eastern Time. Perry and Starke counties remained in Central Time.

On April 29, 2005, with heavy backing from Governor Mitch Daniels' economic development plan, and after years of controversy, the Indiana General Assembly passed a law stating that, effective April 2, 2006, the entire state of Indiana would become the 48th state to observe daylight saving time. The bill was also accompanied by Senate Enrolled Act 127, which required Governor Daniels to seek federal hearings from the USDOT on whether to keep Indiana on Eastern Time with New York City and Ohio or whether to move the entire state back to Central Time with Chicago.

As a result of a review by the USDOT, eight counties were moved from the Eastern Time Zone to the Central Time Zone, effective April 2, 2006. These were Starke and Pulaski counties in the northwest and Daviess, Dubois, Knox, Martin, Perry, and Pike counties in the southwest.

The placement of Martin County into the Central Time Zone, while leaving adjoining Greene and Lawrence Counties in the Eastern Time Zone presented a particular problem for Naval Surface Warfare Center Crane, a large US Navy base that straddles all three counties. With the Eastern/Central dividing line running through the base, NSWC Crane was unable to fully comply with the realigned time zones. The base opted to recognize Central Time, since the portion in Martin County was larger than the portions in Greene and Lawrence combined. This decision presented a larger regional problem, for even though NSWC Crane is Martin County's largest employer, two-thirds of the base's employees live in Greene, Lawrence, Monroe, and other Eastern Time Zone counties. This meant that the vast majority of Crane's employees would live in one time zone but work in another. Furthermore, a business park under construction at Crane's west gate would also straddle the new dividing line, with businesses on one side of the street being in a different time zone from those on the other. After one year under this awkward arrangement, Martin County reconsidered their bid to be placed in the Central Time Zone and formally petitioned for a return to the Eastern Time Zone.

Independent from the situation facing Martin County, Pulaski County also formally petitioned for a return to the Eastern Time Zone. Pulaski County Commissioners and County Council both voted unanimously on February 6, 2006, to declare home rule and stay on Eastern Time if a federal agency did not grant an appeal to change the time zone ruling. However, the county conceded on March 27, 2006, officially accepting Central Time and switching time zones on April 2, 2006. After some residents pledged to unofficially continue observing Eastern Time, the county changed work hours for most county employees so that they were in sync with Eastern Time work hours. Dubois, Daviess, Knox, and Pike counties also decided to ask the federal government to return them to the Eastern Time Zone, and Dubois did so on April 27, 2006. The confusion involving the time status of these counties led to their being dubbed the "seesaw six."

Pulaski County returned to Eastern Time on March 11, the date when daylight saving time resumed. When standard time resumed on November 4, the five southwestern counties (Daviess, Dubois, Knox, Martin, and Pike) returned to the Eastern Time Zone. A petition from Perry County to move to the Eastern Time Zone was denied.

With the exception of Perry and Starke counties, all counties that were moved to the Central Time Zone in 2006 were moved back to the Eastern Time Zone in 2007.

== Ongoing controversy ==
The decades-long Indiana time zone debate remains controversial. Some argue that the entire state should move to Central Time, while some others would prefer to have the state return to the non-observance of DST.

Many farmers oppose DST because their days are controlled by the sun, not the clock. Farmers are often dependent on younger workers whose parents want them home by dinner, and when the sun is up later in the evening, farmers miss out on recreational activities that take place later in the day. When the sun is still up at 9 to 9:30 p.m., the farmer is still in the field, while others have been off work for hours.

Opponents of putting the entire state on one time zone often cite out-of-state cities as their reason of opposition. For example, counties in northwestern Indiana are part of the Chicago metropolitan area. Many residents commute to Chicago, which is on Central Time. Counties in the southeastern corner of the state are suburbs of cities such as Cincinnati, Ohio, and Louisville, Kentucky, which both observe Eastern Time. In the southwestern corner of the state, Evansville serves as the central hub of a tri-state area that includes Southeastern Illinois and Northwestern Kentucky (both regions being entirely on Central Time).

Supporters of daylight saving time and a common time zone in Indiana often claim Indiana must adopt the time-keeping system of the eastern United States to preserve interstate business with that region. Some believe that Indiana businesses have lost hours of productive time with out-of-state colleagues because the time quirks are too confusing to keep track of on a daily basis. The confusion caused to outsiders featured prominently in the plot of an episode of The West Wing in which presidential aides unfamiliar with Indiana's non-observance of DST miss their return flight to Washington, D.C., on Air Force One and express consternation with the variances in the state's time measurement.

Detractors of daylight saving time claim that scientific studies assessing the impact of the time policy change to DST in Indiana have identified a significant increase in energy usage and spending on electricity by Indiana households. Indiana households paid an additional $8.6 million in electricity bills according to University of California, Santa Barbara economics professor Matthew Kotchen and Ph.D. student Laura Grant, while supporters of Daylight Saving Time point to studies such as Professor Kotchen, the Department of Transportation and organizations such as the California Energy Commission claim that the United States saves approximately 1% of energy when Daylight Saving Time is being observed.

Another wrinkle in the issue is the unnatural geographic location of this Eastern-Time-Zoned region. In the western Indiana counties where Eastern time is observed (Mishawaka/South Bend and Lafayette south to Terre Haute and Vincennes), around the summer solstice, the sun neither sets until after 9:20 p.m., nor does it reach solar noon until almost 2:00 p.m. With the sun rising as late as 8:20 a.m. in some areas during winter, available sunlight is inadequate to safely thaw the roads for school buses to pick up all their passengers on time. The argument is that if the same area were in its geographically natural Central time zone, the sun would be up an hour sooner, and it would have an additional hour to thaw the roads every morning.

== See also ==
- Time in the United States
- List of counties in Indiana
- David Camm, whose wrongful conviction for murder involved — among other things — confusion regarding Indiana's time zones
