= Time in Connecticut =

Time zone data for this US state

Time in Connecticut, as in all US states, is regulated by the United States Department of Transportation. Connecticut is in the Eastern Time Zone (ET) and observes daylight saving time (DST).

Time in Connecticut
	Time	UTC
Standard time (winter)	Eastern Standard Time (EST)	UTC−05:00
Daylight time (summer)	Eastern Daylight Time (EDT)	UTC−04:00

Independent of daylight saving time, solar noon in Connecticut on the March equinox is approximately 11:54 in the northeast corner and 12:02 in the southwest corner. New England, which includes Connecticut, is one of the few areas in the United States where solar noon is before noon. Connecticut legislation as recently as January 2019 has been proposed that could ultimately lead to a change in the state's time zone and possibly New England's as well, moving to the Atlantic Time Zone, if Massachusetts and Rhode Island do the same.

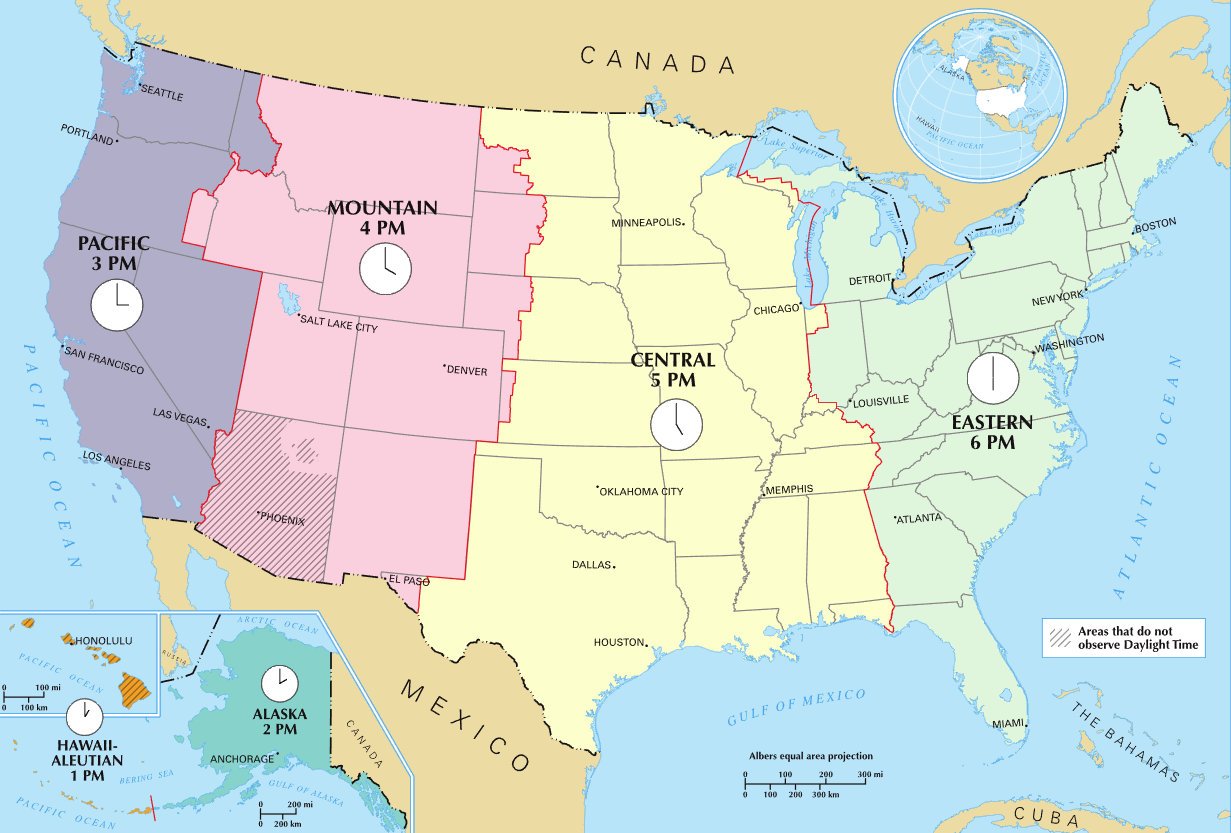
United States time zones

Solar noon (independent of DST)
Date (approx.)	Location		
Date (approx.)	Greenwich	Hartford	Thompson
March equinox	12:02	11:58	11:54
June solstice	11:56	11:52	11:49
September equinox	11:48	11:44	11:40
December solstice	11:53	11:49	11:45

== IANA time zone database ==
The IANA time zone database identifier for Connecticut is America/New_York.

== See also ==
- Time in New England states:
  - Connecticut
  - Maine
  - Massachusetts
  - New Hampshire
  - Rhode Island
  - Vermont
