= Time in New Hampshire =

Time zone data for this US state

Time in New Hampshire, as in all US states, is regulated by the United States Department of Transportation. New Hampshire is in the Eastern Time Zone (ET) and observes daylight saving time (DST).

Time in New Hampshire
	Time	UTC
Standard time (winter)	Eastern Standard Time (EST)	UTC−05:00
Daylight time (summer)	Eastern Daylight Time (EDT)	UTC−04:00

Independent of daylight saving time, solar noon at the March equinox is about 11:57 in southwestern New Hampshire and 11:50 in southeastern New Hampshire. New England, which includes New Hampshire, is one of the few areas in the United States where solar noon is before noon. Because solar noon is earlier than most of the rest of the country, and New Hampshire is at a high latitude, sunset can be earlier than in most states.

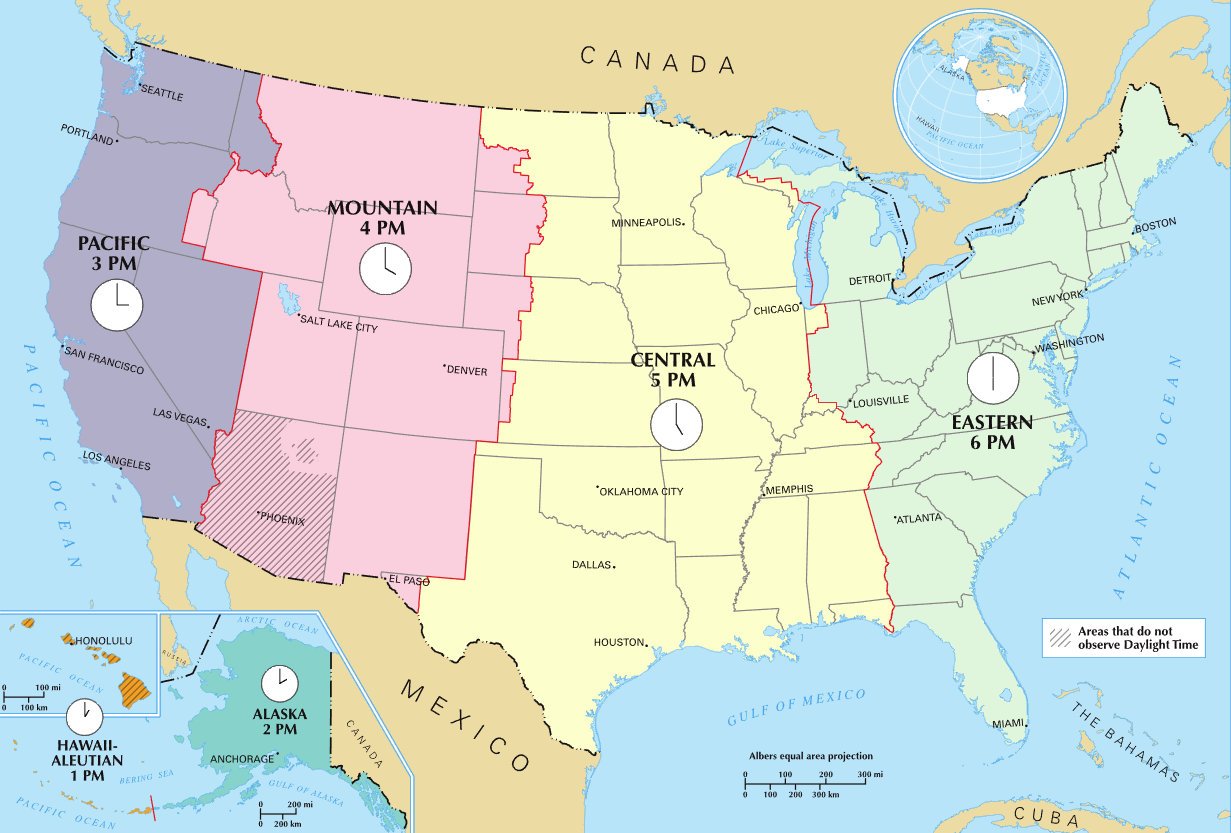
United States time zones

Solar noon (independent of DST)
Date (approx.)	Location		
Date (approx.)	Hinsdale	Concord	Portsmouth
March equinox	11:57	11:53	11:50
June solstice	11:51	11:48	11:45
September equinox	11:43	11:39	11:36
December solstice	11:48	11:44	11:41

Some state lawmakers have encouraged the state to switch to Atlantic Standard Time without DST. A bill to do so, as long as Massachusetts did the same, passed the state's House of Representatives in 2017 but was voted down by the state's Senate.

== IANA time zone database ==
The IANA time zone database identifier for New Hampshire is America/New_York.

== See also ==
Time in New England states: Connecticut, Maine, Massachusetts, New Hampshire, Rhode Island, Vermont
