= Time in France =

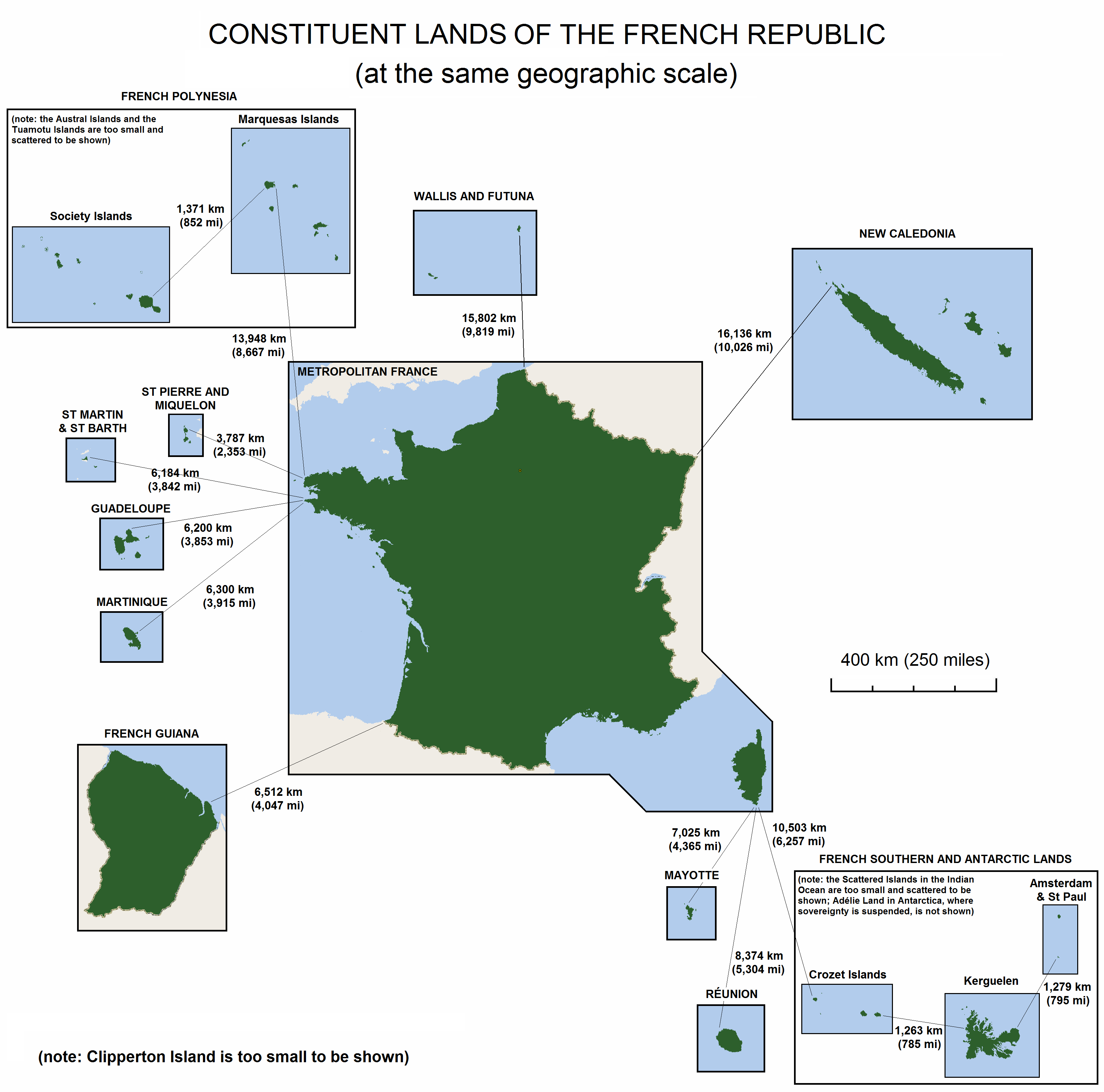
The lands making up the French Republic, shown at the same geographic scale.

Metropolitan France uses Central European Time (heure d'Europe centrale, UTC+01:00) as its standard time, and observes Central European Summer Time (heure d'été d'Europe centrale, UTC+02:00) from the last Sunday in March to the last Sunday in October. With its overseas territories, France uses 12 different time zones (13 including its claim in Antarctica), more than any other country in the world.

== Time zones ==
All parts of Overseas France use different time zones from Metropolitan France.

Territory		Standard time	Summer time
French Polynesia	Society, Tuamotu and Austral islands	UTC−10:00	
French Polynesia	Marquesas Islands	UTC−09:30	
French Polynesia	Gambier Islands	UTC−09:00	
Clipperton Island		UTC−08:00	
Guadeloupe		UTC−04:00	
Martinique		UTC−04:00	
Saint Barthélemy		UTC−04:00	
Saint Martin		UTC−04:00	
French Guiana		UTC−03:00	
Saint Pierre and Miquelon		UTC−03:00	UTC−02:00
Metropolitan France		UTC+01:00	UTC+02:00
Mayotte		UTC+03:00	
Réunion		UTC+04:00	
French Southern and Antarctic Lands	Scattered Islands	UTC+03:00	
French Southern and Antarctic Lands	Crozet Islands	UTC+04:00	
French Southern and Antarctic Lands	Kerguelen, Saint Paul and Amsterdam islands	UTC+05:00	
French Southern and Antarctic Lands	Adélie Land	UTC+10:00	
New Caledonia		UTC+11:00	
Wallis and Futuna		UTC+12:00	

== Summer time ==
Metropolitan France follows the summer time schedule in Europe. Summer time starts on the last Sunday in March at 01:00 UTC, when local time changes from 02:00 (UTC+01:00) to 03:00 (UTC+02:00), and ends on the last Sunday in October at 01:00 UTC, when local time changes from 03:00 (UTC+02:00) to 02:00 (UTC+01:00).

Saint Pierre and Miquelon follows the daylight saving time schedule of Canada and of the United States. It starts on the second Sunday in March at 02:00 (UTC−03:00), when local time changes to 03:00 (UTC−02:00), and ends on the first Sunday in November at 02:00 (UTC−02:00), when local time changes to 01:00 (UTC−03:00).

Other parts of Overseas France do not observe summer time.

== History ==
Before 1891, each town and city in Metropolitan France had its own time based on local solar time. In 1891, to avoid complications with railway timetables, time was unified in Metropolitan France and based on the solar time at the Paris Observatory — the Paris meridian being approximately 2°20′ east of the Greenwich meridian, Paris mean solar time was 9 minutes 21 seconds ahead of Greenwich Mean Time (GMT). In detail, the railway companies used a unified time which lagged behind Paris solar time by 5 minutes, for the benefit of non-punctual travellers. In 1911, Metropolitan France adopted GMT+0 as its official time, and used it until 1940 (with GMT+1 used during the summers from 1916 to 1940).

In the summer of 1940, the German military authorities switched the occupied northern part of Metropolitan France to GMT+2 (German summer time), while the non-occupied southern part of Metropolitan France remained at GMT+1 (French summer time). The Vichy authorities kept GMT+1 (French summer time) during the winter of 1940–1941 and adopted GMT+2 (double summer time, which was the same as German summer time) in May 1941 in order to unify the railway timetables between occupied and non-occupied Metropolitan France. In 1942, 1943, and 1944 the whole of Metropolitan France thus used GMT+2 during the summer, and GMT+1 during the winter.

At the Liberation of France in the summer of 1944, Metropolitan France kept GMT+2 as it was the time then used by the Allies (British Double Summer Time). In the winter of 1944–1945, Metropolitan France switched to GMT+1, same as in the United Kingdom, and switched again to GMT+2 in April 1945. In September 1945, Metropolitan France returned to GMT+1 (pre-war summer time), which the British had already done in July 1945. Metropolitan France was officially scheduled to return to GMT+0 on November 18, 1945 (the British returned to GMT+0 in on October 7, 1945), but the French government canceled the decision on November 5, 1945, and GMT+1 has since then remained the official time of Metropolitan France.

In 1976, daylight saving time (summer time) was reintroduced in Metropolitan France for the first time since WW2 because of the oil crisis, and since 1976 Metropolitan France has thus been at GMT+1 (now UTC+01:00) during the winter and GMT+2 (now UTC+02:00) during the summer. In 1996, daylight saving time was harmonized throughout the European Union by Directive 2000/84/EC, which moved the end of DST to the last Sunday in October.

A proposal to repeal this directive and require that member states observe their own choice of time year-round from 2021 is going through the legislative process as of March 2019. A non-binding public consultation showed that approximately 59% of respondents would prefer France to apply year-round summer time (UTC+02:00), with 37% in favour of year-round winter time (UTC+01:00) and 4% expressing no preference.

Since GMT (now UTC) is Metropolitan France's "natural" time zone (being geographically correct), its use of UTC+01:00 in winter can be seen as a form of daylight saving time in winter, while Central European Summer Time (UTC+02:00) can be seen as a form of "double summer time."

== IANA time zone database ==
The IANA time zone database contains one zone for Metropolitan France in the file zone.tab, named Europe/Paris.

c.c.	Coordinates	Timezone name	Comments	UTC offset (Std.)	UTC offset (DST)
PF	−1732−14934	Pacific/Tahiti	Society Islands	−10:00	
PF	−0900−13930	Pacific/Marquesas	Marquesas Islands	−09:30	
PF	−2308−13457	Pacific/Gambier	Gambier Islands	−09:00	
GP	+1614−06132	America/Guadeloupe		−04:00	
MQ	+1436−06105	America/Martinique		−04:00	
BL	+1753−06251	America/St_Barthelemy		−04:00	
MF	+1804−06305	America/Marigot		−04:00	
GF	+0456−05220	America/Cayenne		−03:00	
PM	+4703−05620	America/Miquelon		−03:00	−02:00
FR	+4852+00220	Europe/Paris		+01:00	+02:00
YT	−1247+04514	Indian/Mayotte		+03:00	
RE	−2052+05528	Indian/Reunion		+04:00	
TF	−492110+0701303	Indian/Kerguelen		+05:00	
AQ	−6640+14001	Antarctica/DumontDUrville	Dumont-d'Urville	+10:00	
NC	−2216+16627	Pacific/Noumea		+11:00	
WF	−1318−17610	Pacific/Wallis		+12:00	

== See also ==
- List of time zones
