= Time in Maine =

Time zone data for this US state

Time in Maine, as in all US states, is regulated by the United States Department of Transportation. All of Maine is in the Eastern Time Zone (ET) and observes daylight saving time (DST).

Time in Maine
| | Time | UTC |
|---|---|---|
| Standard time (winter) | Eastern Standard Time (EST) | UTC−05:00 |
| Daylight time (summer) | Eastern Daylight Time (EDT) | UTC−04:00 |

Eastern Maine has the earliest solar noon of the contiguous United States, and the portion of the state that is east of 67.5°W longitude is geographically in the Atlantic Time Zone, which is used by adjacent New Brunswick, Canada. Independent of daylight saving time, solar noon at the March equinox is approximately 11:50 in the southwestern part of the state, and 11:35 at West Quoddy Head Light, the easternmost point of the contiguous United States.

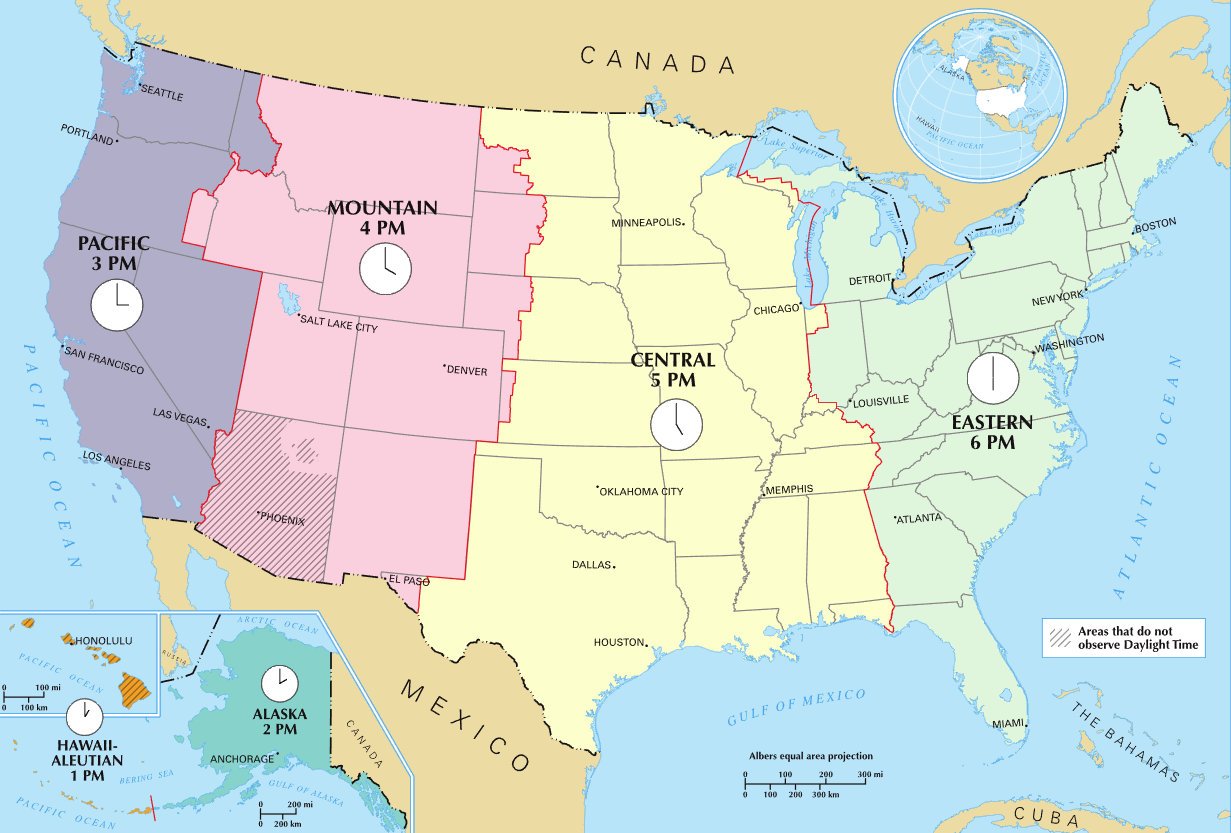
United States time zones

Solar noon (independent of DST)
| Date (approx.) | Location | | |
|---|---|---|---|
| Date (approx.) | Kittery | Augusta | West Quoddy Head Light |
| March equinox | 11:50 | 11:46 | 11:35 |
| June solstice | 11:45 | 11:41 | 11:30 |
| September equinox | 11:36 | 11:32 | 11:21 |
| December solstice | 11:41 | 11:37 | 11:26 |

During winter, sunset can occur in far northeastern areas as early as 3:42 p.m. Most of the New England states have considered using the Atlantic Time Zone without daylight saving to mitigate this. In 2005, the Maine Legislature considered switching the entire state to Atlantic Standard Time all year long and eliminating daylight saving time. The bill did not pass.

== IANA time zone database ==
The IANA time zone database identifier for Maine is America/New_York.

== See also ==
Time in New England states: Connecticut, Massachusetts, New Hampshire, Rhode Island, Vermont
