= Time in Rhode Island =

Time zone data for this US state

Time in Rhode Island, as in all US states, is regulated by the United States Department of Transportation. Rhode Island is in the Eastern Time Zone (ET) and observes daylight saving time (DST).

Time in Rhode Island
	Time	UTC
Standard time (winter)	Eastern Standard Time (EST)	UTC−05:00
Daylight time (summer)	Eastern Daylight Time (EDT)	UTC−04:00

Independent of daylight saving time, solar noon in Rhode Island on the March equinox is about 11:53, which is earlier than most areas of the United States. The state is small enough that geographical location only results in a difference of a few minutes.

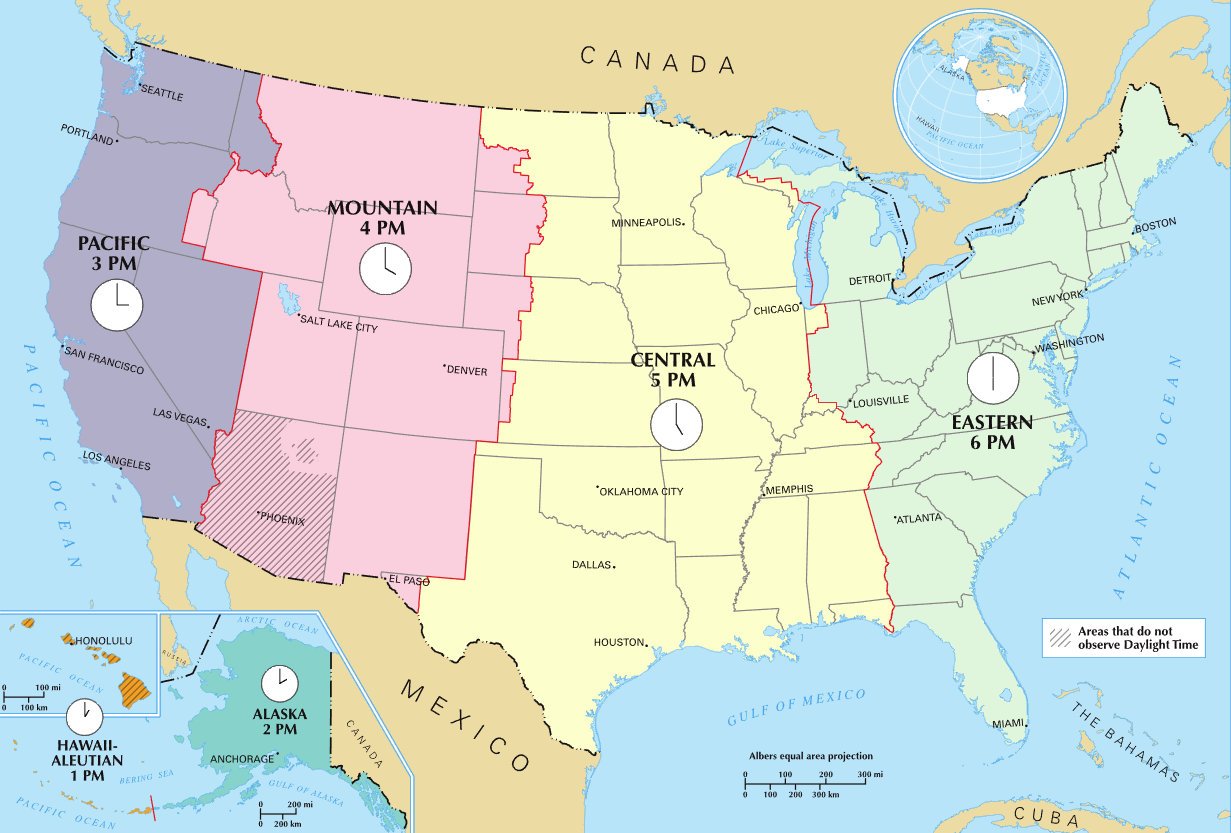
United States time zones

Solar noon (independent of DST)
Date (approx.)	Location		
Date (approx.)	Westerly	Providence	Little Compton
March equinox	11:54	11:52	11:52
June solstice	11:49	11:47	11:46
September equinox	11:40	11:39	11:38
December solstice	11:45	11:44	11:43

Like the other five New England states, which also use the Eastern Time Zone, sunset in the winter in Rhode Island can occur as early as 4:30 p.m. Most of the New England states have considered using the Atlantic Time Zone without daylight saving to mitigate this. While Rhode Island considered such a bill in 2016, it would only take effect if Massachusetts did the same.

== IANA time zone database ==
The IANA time zone database identifier for Rhode Island is America/New_York.

== See also ==
Time in New England states: Connecticut, Maine, Massachusetts, New Hampshire, Rhode Island, Vermont
