= Time in Massachusetts =

Time zone data for this US state

Time in Massachusetts, as in all US states, is regulated by the United States Department of Transportation. Massachusetts is in the Eastern Time Zone (ET) and observes daylight saving time (DST).

Time in Massachusetts
	Time	UTC
Standard time (winter)	Eastern Standard Time (EST)	UTC−05:00
Daylight time (summer)	Eastern Daylight Time (EDT)	UTC−04:00

Independent of daylight saving time, solar noon on the March equinox is about 12:00 in Western Massachusetts and 11:47 in Nantucket to the east. New England, which includes Massachusetts, is one of the few areas in the United States where solar noon is before noon.

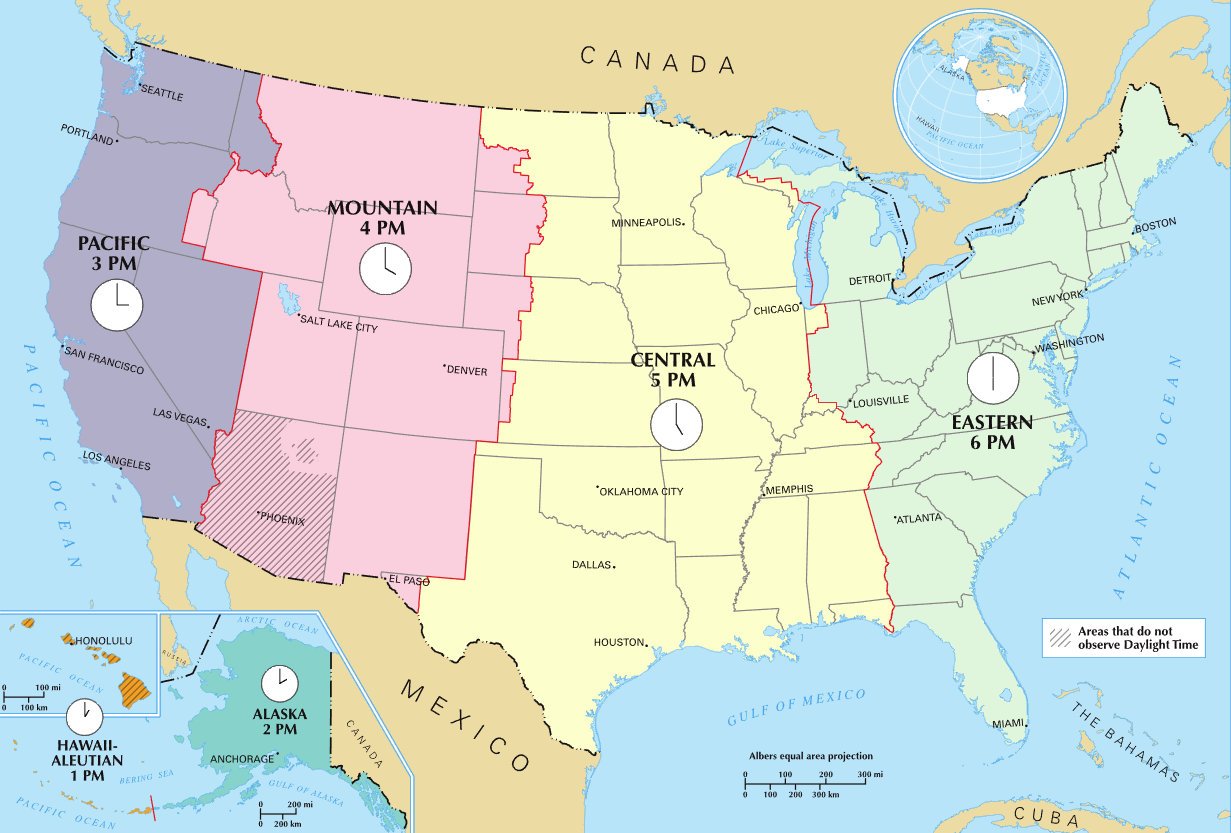
United States time zones

Solar noon (independent of DST)
Date (approx.)	Location		
Date (approx.)	Pittsfield	Boston	Nantucket
March equinox	12:00	11:51	11:47
June solstice	11:55	11:46	11:42
September equinox	11:46	11:37	11:33
December solstice	11:51	11:42	11:38

In 2016, a committee in the state was formed to consider having Massachusetts adopt Atlantic Standard Time year round to prevent sunsets from occurring before 16:30 and eliminate the need to change clocks at the beginning and end of daylight saving time. The committee submitted its report to the state legislature in November 2017, recommending the move "under certain circumstances". If passed, Massachusetts would use Atlantic Standard Time all year round without daylight saving time. Other New England states are looking into doing the same.

== IANA time zone database ==
The IANA time zone database identifier for Massachusetts is America/New_York.

== See also ==
Time in New England states: Connecticut, Maine, Massachusetts, New Hampshire, Rhode Island, Vermont
