= 2023 IHF Inter-Continental Trophy =

Tournament details
- Host country: Costa Rica
- Venue(s): 1 (in 1 host city)
- Dates: 7–11 March

The 2023 IHF Inter-Continental Trophy was held from 7 to 11 March 2023 in San José, Costa Rica. It was featured a men's youth (U-19) tournament and a men's junior (U-21) tournament. The winners of both events qualified for the World Championships in their respective age categories.

== Junior tournament ==
=== Qualification ===
Confederation	Dates	Host	Vacancies	Qualified
Europe (EHF)	11–15 October 2022	(Kosovo) Pristina	1	Great Britain
South and Central America (SCAHC)	8–12 November 2022	(Argentina) Buenos Aires	1	Costa Rica
Oceania (OCHF)	5–9 December 2022	(Cook Islands) Rarotonga	1	Australia
North America and the Caribbean (NACHC)	12–17 December 2022	Mexico City	1	Cuba
Africa (CAHB)	16–20 January 2023	(Democratic Republic of the Congo) Brazzaville	1	Guinea

=== Results ===
Pos	Team	Pld	W	D	L	GF	GA	GD	Pts	Qualification
1st place, gold medalist(s)	Cuba	4	3	0	1	158	110	+48	6 (Note: Cuba 2 Pts, +10 GD; Guinea 2 Pts, –3 GD; Great Britain 2 Pts, –7 GD)	
2nd place, silver medalist(s)	Guinea	4	3	0	1	137	103	+34	6	2023 Junior World Championship
3rd place, bronze medalist(s)	Great Britain	4	3	0	1	134	105	+29	6	
4	Costa Rica (H)	4	1	0	3	123	129	−6	2	
5	Australia	4	0	0	4	71	176	−105	0	

Source: IHF
Rules for classification: 1) points; 2) head-to-head points; 3) head-to-head goal difference; 4) head-to-head number of goals scored; 5) goal difference.
(H) Hosts
Notes:

All times are local (UTC–6).

7 March 2023; 15:00	Guinea	35–32	Cuba	BN Arena, San José; Attendance: 257; Referees: Altmár, Horváth (HUN)
7 March 2023; 15:00	Camara 14	(19–16)	González 7	BN Arena, San José; Attendance: 257; Referees: Altmár, Horváth (HUN)
7 March 2023; 15:00	1× (yellow card) 4× (suspension)	Report	1× (yellow card) 4× (suspension)	BN Arena, San José; Attendance: 257; Referees: Altmár, Horváth (HUN)

7 March 2023; 20:00	Australia	17–43	Costa Rica	BN Arena, San José; Attendance: 477; Referees: Chouraki, El Mouniri (MAR)
7 March 2023; 20:00	Pena Gonzalez 5	(7–17)	three players 6	BN Arena, San José; Attendance: 477; Referees: Chouraki, El Mouniri (MAR)
7 March 2023; 20:00	1× (suspension)	Report	2× (suspension)	BN Arena, San José; Attendance: 477; Referees: Chouraki, El Mouniri (MAR)

8 March 2023; 15:00	Cuba	44–16	Australia	BN Arena, San José; Attendance: 113; Referees: Hellbusch, Jansen (GER)
8 March 2023; 15:00	González 13	(17–6)	Pena Gonzalez, Toze 3	BN Arena, San José; Attendance: 113; Referees: Hellbusch, Jansen (GER)
8 March 2023; 15:00	7× (suspension)	Report	2× (suspension)	BN Arena, San José; Attendance: 113; Referees: Hellbusch, Jansen (GER)

8 March 2023; 19:00	Guinea	26–32	Great Britain	BN Arena, San José; Attendance: 326; Referees: Conberse, Correa (ARG)
8 March 2023; 19:00	Drame 7	(13–16)	Nelson 7	BN Arena, San José; Attendance: 326; Referees: Conberse, Correa (ARG)
8 March 2023; 19:00	9× (suspension) 1× (red card)	Report	3× (suspension)	BN Arena, San José; Attendance: 326; Referees: Conberse, Correa (ARG)

9 March 2023; 15:00	Australia	17–40	Guinea	BN Arena, San José; Attendance: 122; Referees: Poulet, Marques (USA)
9 March 2023; 15:00	Hodgson 6	(9–24)	Camara 14	BN Arena, San José; Attendance: 122; Referees: Poulet, Marques (USA)
9 March 2023; 15:00	4× (suspension)	Report	2× (suspension)	BN Arena, San José; Attendance: 122; Referees: Poulet, Marques (USA)

9 March 2023; 19:00	Great Britain	30–22	Costa Rica	BN Arena, San José; Attendance: 560; Referees: Altmár, Horváth (HUN)
9 March 2023; 19:00	Wardle 8	(10–16)	Vargas Alfaro 7	BN Arena, San José; Attendance: 560; Referees: Altmár, Horváth (HUN)
9 March 2023; 19:00	1× (yellow card) 5× (suspension)	Report	7× (suspension)	BN Arena, San José; Attendance: 560; Referees: Altmár, Horváth (HUN)

10 March 2023; 15:00	Cuba	36–23	Great Britain	BN Arena, San José; Attendance: 217; Referees: Chouraki, El Mouniri (MAR)
10 March 2023; 15:00	Almeida Duquenze 13	(17–14)	Joseph 7	BN Arena, San José; Attendance: 217; Referees: Chouraki, El Mouniri (MAR)
10 March 2023; 15:00	1× (yellow card) 5× (suspension) 1× (red card)	Report	1× (suspension)	BN Arena, San José; Attendance: 217; Referees: Chouraki, El Mouniri (MAR)

10 March 2023; 19:00	Costa Rica	22–36	Guinea	BN Arena, San José; Attendance: 528; Referees: Hellbusch, Jansen (GER)
10 March 2023; 19:00	Vargas Alfaro 5	(8–18)	Drame 15	BN Arena, San José; Attendance: 528; Referees: Hellbusch, Jansen (GER)
10 March 2023; 19:00	1× (suspension)	Report	4× (suspension)	BN Arena, San José; Attendance: 528; Referees: Hellbusch, Jansen (GER)

11 March 2023; 15:00	Great Britain	49–21	Australia	BN Arena, San José; Attendance: 96; Referees: Hellbusch, Jansen (GER)
11 March 2023; 15:00	Trent, Johnson 12	(31–5)	Meagher 5	BN Arena, San José; Attendance: 96; Referees: Hellbusch, Jansen (GER)
11 March 2023; 15:00	4× (suspension)	Report	5× (suspension)	BN Arena, San José; Attendance: 96; Referees: Hellbusch, Jansen (GER)

11 March 2023; 19:00	Costa Rica	36–46	Cuba	BN Arena, San José; Attendance: 1,126; Referees: Conberse, Correa (ARG)
11 March 2023; 19:00	Suarez Matarrita, Montoya Montiel 6	(13–22)	Vazquez Aballi 11	BN Arena, San José; Attendance: 1,126; Referees: Conberse, Correa (ARG)
11 March 2023; 19:00	1× (yellow card) 2× (suspension)	Report	5× (suspension)	BN Arena, San José; Attendance: 1,126; Referees: Conberse, Correa (ARG)

== Youth tournament ==
=== Qualification ===
Confederation	Dates	Host	Vacancies	Qualified
Europe (EHF)	11–15 October 2022	(Kosovo) Pristina	1	Georgia
South and Central America (SCAHC)	8–12 November 2022	(Argentina) Buenos Aires	1	Nicaragua
North America and the Caribbean (NACHC)	15–19 November 2022	Mexico City	1	Guadeloupe
Oceania (OCHF)	5–9 December 2022	(Cook Islands) Rarotonga	1	Tahiti
Africa (CAHB)	16–20 January 2023	(Democratic Republic of the Congo) Brazzaville	1	Nigeria

=== Results ===
Pos	Team	Pld	W	D	L	GF	GA	GD	Pts	Qualification
1st place, gold medalist(s)	Guadeloupe	4	3	1	0	154	117	+37	7	
2nd place, silver medalist(s)	Georgia	4	3	0	1	136	107	+29	6	2023 Youth World Championship
3rd place, bronze medalist(s)	Nigeria	4	2	1	1	166	111	+55	5	
4	Nicaragua	4	1	0	3	135	159	−24	2	
5	Tahiti	4	0	0	4	83	180	−97	0	

Source: IHF
Rules for classification: 1) points; 2) head-to-head points; 3) head-to-head goal difference; 4) head-to-head number of goals scored; 5) goal difference.

All times are local (UTC–6).

7 March 2023; 13:00	Nicaragua	27–43	Georgia	BN Arena, San José; Attendance: 103; Referees: Poulet, Marques (USA)
7 March 2023; 13:00	Maradiaga Alvardo 7	(8–17)	Darsania 9	BN Arena, San José; Attendance: 103; Referees: Poulet, Marques (USA)
7 March 2023; 13:00	5× (suspension)	Report	5× (suspension)	BN Arena, San José; Attendance: 103; Referees: Poulet, Marques (USA)

7 March 2023; 17:00	Tahiti	18–43	Guadeloupe	BN Arena, San José; Attendance: 121; Referees: Conberse, Correa (ARG)
7 March 2023; 17:00	Tetuanui 7	(9–17)	three players 6	BN Arena, San José; Attendance: 121; Referees: Conberse, Correa (ARG)
7 March 2023; 17:00	2× (suspension) 1× (red card)	Report	1× (yellow card) 1× (suspension)	BN Arena, San José; Attendance: 121; Referees: Conberse, Correa (ARG)

8 March 2023; 13:00	Georgia	36–20	Tahiti	BN Arena, San José; Attendance: 37; Referees: Chouraki, El Mouniri (MAR)
8 March 2023; 13:00	Mukbaniani, Khelisupali 8	(18–9)	Barff 5	BN Arena, San José; Attendance: 37; Referees: Chouraki, El Mouniri (MAR)
8 March 2023; 13:00	1× (yellow card) 2× (suspension) 1× (red card)	Report	4× (suspension) 1× (red card)	BN Arena, San José; Attendance: 37; Referees: Chouraki, El Mouniri (MAR)

8 March 2023; 17:00	Nicaragua	30–46	Nigeria	BN Arena, San José; Attendance: 84; Referees: Altmár, Horváth (HUN)
8 March 2023; 17:00	three players 5	(9–19)	Kuti, Suliamon 9	BN Arena, San José; Attendance: 84; Referees: Altmár, Horváth (HUN)
8 March 2023; 17:00	4× (suspension)	Report	8× (suspension)	BN Arena, San José; Attendance: 84; Referees: Altmár, Horváth (HUN)

9 March 2023; 13:00	Nigeria	32–32	Guadeloupe	BN Arena, San José; Attendance: 174; Referees: Chouraki, El Mouniri (MAR)
9 March 2023; 13:00	Kuti 8	(13–19)	Danquin 9	BN Arena, San José; Attendance: 174; Referees: Chouraki, El Mouniri (MAR)
9 March 2023; 13:00	5× (suspension)	Report		BN Arena, San José; Attendance: 174; Referees: Chouraki, El Mouniri (MAR)

9 March 2023; 17:00	Tahiti	24–40	Nicaragua	BN Arena, San José; Attendance: 107; Referees: Hellbusch, Jansen (GER)
9 March 2023; 17:00	Barff 9	(9–24)	Perez Sinclair 8	BN Arena, San José; Attendance: 107; Referees: Hellbusch, Jansen (GER)
9 March 2023; 17:00	3× (suspension)	Report	1× (yellow card) 2× (suspension)	BN Arena, San José; Attendance: 107; Referees: Hellbusch, Jansen (GER)

10 March 2023; 13:00	Nigeria	61–21	Tahiti	BN Arena, San José; Attendance: 100; Referees: Poulet, Marques (USA)
10 March 2023; 13:00	Isyaka 15	(27–5)	Barff 7	BN Arena, San José; Attendance: 100; Referees: Poulet, Marques (USA)
10 March 2023; 13:00	2× (suspension)	Report	1× (suspension)	BN Arena, San José; Attendance: 100; Referees: Poulet, Marques (USA)

10 March 2023; 17:00	Guadeloupe	33–29	Georgia	BN Arena, San José; Attendance: 337; Referees: Conberse, Correa (ARG)
10 March 2023; 17:00	Danquin, Joseph 7	(18–11)	Khelisupali 9	BN Arena, San José; Attendance: 337; Referees: Conberse, Correa (ARG)
10 March 2023; 17:00	5× (suspension) 1× (red card)	Report	1× (yellow card) 4× (suspension)	BN Arena, San José; Attendance: 337; Referees: Conberse, Correa (ARG)

11 March 2023; 13:00	Guadeloupe	46–38	Nicaragua	BN Arena, San José; Attendance: 54; Referees: Poulet, Marques (USA)
11 March 2023; 13:00	Djorick 11	(22–15)	Gonzalez Castillo, Lewin Presida 8	BN Arena, San José; Attendance: 54; Referees: Poulet, Marques (USA)
11 March 2023; 13:00	3× (suspension)	Report	2× (suspension)	BN Arena, San José; Attendance: 54; Referees: Poulet, Marques (USA)

11 March 2023; 17:00	Georgia	28–27	Nigeria	BN Arena, San José; Attendance: 746; Referees: Altmár, Horváth (HUN)
11 March 2023; 17:00	Darsania 7	(16–15)	Shagari 13	BN Arena, San José; Attendance: 746; Referees: Altmár, Horváth (HUN)
11 March 2023; 17:00	1× (yellow card) 3× (suspension)	Report	7× (suspension)	BN Arena, San José; Attendance: 746; Referees: Altmár, Horváth (HUN)
