= 20 Hours in America =

- The West Wing episodes
- Episode nos.: Season 4 Episodes 1 & 2
- Directed by: Christopher Misiano
- Written by: Aaron Sorkin
- Production codes: 175301; 175302
- Original air date: September 25, 2002

Guest appearances
- Ron Silver; John Amos; Anna Deavere Smith; Amy Adams; NiCole Robinson; Renée Estevez; Valorie Armstrong; Alan Dale; Danielle Harris; John Gallagher Jr.; Lily Tomlin; Jennifer Armour; John P. Connolly; Don Perry; Andrew McFarlane

Episode chronology
| ← Previous "Posse Comitatus" | Next → "College Kids" |
- The West Wing season 4

"20 Hours in America" is the two-part fourth season premiere of The West Wing. The episode aired on September 25, 2002, on NBC. In the episodes, President Josiah Bartlet deals with multiple crises, including a cover-up of the assassination of a foreign dignitary, while Josh Lyman, Toby Ziegler, and Donna Moss attempt to return to the White House after they are accidentally left behind in Indiana.

== Plot ==
President Josiah Bartlet gives a speech on a farm in Indiana during his re-election campaign, while Toby Ziegler and Josh Lyman converse in a field with Cathy, the daughter of the farm owner, about the President's chances of winning Indiana in the upcoming election. They realize that the Presidential motorcade that was transporting them between campaign stops has left without them, leaving them and Donna Moss stranded. The trio attempts to get home, but their journey is delayed by several mishaps (Cathy's truck runs out of biodiesel, they miss their plane due to confusion over Indiana's time zones, they board the wrong train, etc.)

As their journey continues, the trio are exposed to the culture of rural Indiana. Josh and Toby debate campaign strategy, but remain largely oblivious to the problems of the people around them until they meet Matt Kelley, an affable man in a bar who is concerned about how he's going to pay for his daughter's college tuition. This sets into motion a storyline that continues across later episodes, and inspires them attempt to make tuition tax deductible. Finally returning to Washington, Toby and Josh conclude that the election should be about the voters' everyday concerns, instead of simply being about the two candidates.

Meanwhile, an exhausted and overworked Sam Seaborn is supposed to be taking the day off for some much-needed sleep, but Josh instead enlists him to staff the President until they return from their escapade in Indiana. Sam is eventually left with a new appreciation for the intelligence Josh must use on a daily basis.

At the White House, the President deals with crises both home and abroad: A dip in the stock market makes the President superstitious about meeting a man who met with Herbert Hoover just before the stock market crash of '29, and the President later receives news that the Qumar Government is reopening an inquiry into the disappearance of Defense Minister Abdul Sahrif's plane, which was destroyed by U.S. agents in a covert assassination ordered by President Bartlet. Increasingly concerned, the President is nonetheless reassured by Admiral Percy Fitzwallace that they have successfully covered their tracks. Qumar falsely claims that it has found an Israeli Air Force parachute, in an attempt to provoke a military confrontation with Israel through a false flag operation. Fitzwallace and Leo McGarry agree that they cannot exonerate Israel and denounce the false evidence without admitting their own culpability.

Meanwhile, C.J. Cregg approaches Charlie Young about taking over Simon Donovan's role as a big brother to a young man, Anthony, who has started to act up as a way to cope with Simon's death. Charlie is at first unwilling to lend his limited free time to volunteer, but when Anthony lashes out at C.J., Charlie confronts him and offers to become his new mentor. President Bartlet hires Debbie Fiderer to replace Mrs. Landingham as his new executive secretary, after being impressed by both her memory and sharp wit.

A report comes in that two pipe bombs have exploded during a college swim meet, killing 44 people and injuring over 100. Everyone is shaken by this event, but it inspires Sam to write a powerfully uplifting speech, which the President delivers to great effect. Campaign strategist Bruno Gianelli refers to Sam as a 'freak' for being able to write the most moving portion of the speech during the ride to the event.

== Plagiarism incident ==
On May 6, 2006, NBC Sports aired a special program before the Kentucky Derby that plagiarized two passages from the speech that Sam writes for the President following the explosion of the pipe bombs in "20 Hours in America, Part II". The freelance writer responsible for the plagiarism was fired.
