= 2022 North America and Caribbean Men's Youth Handball Championship =

Tournament details
- Host country: Mexico
- Venue(s): 1 (in 1 host city)
- Dates: 15–19 November
- Teams: 6 (from 1 confederation)

Final positions
- Champions: Guadeloupe (1st title)
- Runner-up: Mexico
- Third place: United States
- Fourth place: Canada

Tournament statistics
- Matches played: 15
- Goals scored: 887 (59.13 per match)
- Top scorer(s): (Guadeloupe) Yann Danquin (51 goals)

Awards
- Best player: (Guadeloupe) Yann Danquin

The 2022 North America and Caribbean Men's Youth Handball Championship was the first edition of the tournament, it took place in Mexico City, Mexico, from 15 to 19 November 2022. It acted as the North America and Caribbean qualifying tournament for the 2023 Men's Youth World Handball Championship.

== Results ==
All times are local (UTC–6).

Pos	Team	Pld	W	D	L	GF	GA	GD	Pts	Qualification
1st place, gold medalist(s)	Guadeloupe	5	5	0	0	195	92	+103	10	2023 IHF Inter-Continental Trophy
2nd place, silver medalist(s)	Mexico (H)	5	3	1	1	216	120	+96	7 (Note: United States 33–33 Mexico)	2023 Youth World Championship
3rd place, bronze medalist(s)	United States	5	3	1	1	162	126	+36	7	2023 Youth World Championship
4	Canada	5	2	0	3	115	129	−14	4	
5	Puerto Rico	5	1	0	4	128	162	−34	2	
6	Dominica	5	0	0	5	71	258	−187	0	

Source: NACHC
Rules for classification: 1) Points; 2) Head-to-head points; 3) Head-to-head goal difference; 4) Head-to-head goals scored; 5) Goal difference; 6) Goals scored; 7) Draw.
(H) Hosts
Notes:

15 November 2022; 14:00	Dominica	6–47	United States	Mexican Olympic Sports Center, Mexico City; Attendance: 300
15 November 2022; 14:00		(3–28)		Mexican Olympic Sports Center, Mexico City; Attendance: 300
15 November 2022; 14:00		Report		Mexican Olympic Sports Center, Mexico City; Attendance: 300

15 November 2022; 16:00	Guadeloupe	42–18	Puerto Rico	Mexican Olympic Sports Center, Mexico City; Attendance: 300
15 November 2022; 16:00		(20–5)		Mexican Olympic Sports Center, Mexico City; Attendance: 300
15 November 2022; 16:00		Report		Mexican Olympic Sports Center, Mexico City; Attendance: 300

15 November 2022; 18:00	Canada	18–33	Mexico	Mexican Olympic Sports Center, Mexico City; Attendance: 500
15 November 2022; 18:00		(12–17)		Mexican Olympic Sports Center, Mexico City; Attendance: 500
15 November 2022; 18:00		Report		Mexican Olympic Sports Center, Mexico City; Attendance: 500

16 November 2022; 14:00	Puerto Rico	20–25	Canada	Mexican Olympic Sports Center, Mexico City; Attendance: 200
16 November 2022; 14:00		(6–10)		Mexican Olympic Sports Center, Mexico City; Attendance: 200
16 November 2022; 14:00		Report		Mexican Olympic Sports Center, Mexico City; Attendance: 200

16 November 2022; 16:00	United States	23–41	Guadeloupe	Mexican Olympic Sports Center, Mexico City
16 November 2022; 16:00		(15–19)		Mexican Olympic Sports Center, Mexico City
16 November 2022; 16:00		Report		Mexican Olympic Sports Center, Mexico City

16 November 2022; 18:00	Mexico	79–12	Dominica	Mexican Olympic Sports Center, Mexico City; Attendance: 600
16 November 2022; 18:00		(42–6)		Mexican Olympic Sports Center, Mexico City; Attendance: 600
16 November 2022; 18:00		Report		Mexican Olympic Sports Center, Mexico City; Attendance: 600

17 November 2022; 14:00	Canada	22–29	United States	Mexican Olympic Sports Center, Mexico City; Attendance: 200
17 November 2022; 14:00		(12–14)		Mexican Olympic Sports Center, Mexico City; Attendance: 200
17 November 2022; 14:00		Report		Mexican Olympic Sports Center, Mexico City; Attendance: 200

17 November 2022; 16:00	Dominica	14–53	Guadeloupe	Mexican Olympic Sports Center, Mexico City; Attendance: 200
17 November 2022; 16:00		(7–28)		Mexican Olympic Sports Center, Mexico City; Attendance: 200
17 November 2022; 16:00		Report		Mexican Olympic Sports Center, Mexico City; Attendance: 200

17 November 2022; 18:00	Mexico	45–26	Puerto Rico	Mexican Olympic Sports Center, Mexico City
17 November 2022; 18:00		(19–13)		Mexican Olympic Sports Center, Mexico City
17 November 2022; 18:00		Report		Mexican Olympic Sports Center, Mexico City

18 November 2022; 14:00	Dominica	20–40	Puerto Rico	Mexican Olympic Sports Center, Mexico City; Attendance: 200
18 November 2022; 14:00		(10–18)		Mexican Olympic Sports Center, Mexico City; Attendance: 200
18 November 2022; 14:00		Report		Mexican Olympic Sports Center, Mexico City; Attendance: 200

18 November 2022; 16:00	Guadeloupe	28–11	Canada	Mexican Olympic Sports Center, Mexico City; Attendance: 200
18 November 2022; 16:00		(16–6)		Mexican Olympic Sports Center, Mexico City; Attendance: 200
18 November 2022; 16:00		Report		Mexican Olympic Sports Center, Mexico City; Attendance: 200

18 November 2022; 18:00	United States	33–33	Mexico	Mexican Olympic Sports Center, Mexico City
18 November 2022; 18:00		(16–19)		Mexican Olympic Sports Center, Mexico City
18 November 2022; 18:00		Report		Mexican Olympic Sports Center, Mexico City

19 November 2022; 14:00	Puerto Rico	24–30	United States	Mexican Olympic Sports Center, Mexico City; Attendance: 200
19 November 2022; 14:00		(11–16)		Mexican Olympic Sports Center, Mexico City; Attendance: 200
19 November 2022; 14:00		Report		Mexican Olympic Sports Center, Mexico City; Attendance: 200

19 November 2022; 16:00	Canada	39–19	Dominica	Mexican Olympic Sports Center, Mexico City
19 November 2022; 16:00		(22–9)		Mexican Olympic Sports Center, Mexico City
19 November 2022; 16:00		Report		Mexican Olympic Sports Center, Mexico City

19 November 2022; 18:00	Mexico	26–31	Guadeloupe	Mexican Olympic Sports Center, Mexico City
19 November 2022; 18:00		(13–19)		Mexican Olympic Sports Center, Mexico City
19 November 2022; 18:00		Report		Mexican Olympic Sports Center, Mexico City
