= Time in Peru =

Peru Time or sometimes Peru Standard Time (PET) is the official time in Peru. It is always 5 hours behind Coordinated Universal Time (UTC−05:00). Peru has only one time zone and does not observe daylight saving time.

== IANA time zone database ==
In the IANA time zone database Peru has the following time zone:

- America/Lima (PE)
