= 2022 North America and Caribbean Men's Junior Handball Championship =

Tournament details
- Host country: Mexico
- Venue(s): 1 (in 1 host city)
- Dates: 12–17 December
- Teams: 7 (from 1 confederation)

Final positions
- Champions: Cuba (1st title)
- Runner-up: United States
- Third place: Martinique
- Fourth place: Guadeloupe

Tournament statistics
- Matches played: 15
- Goals scored: 868 (57.87 per match)
- Top scorer(s): (Cuba) Maiko Vázquez (38 goals)

Awards
- Best player: (United States) Elliot Robertson

The 2022 North America and Caribbean Men's Junior Handball Championship was the first edition of the tournament, it took place in Mexico City, Mexico, from 12 to 17 December 2022. It acted as the North America and Caribbean qualifying tournament for the 2023 Men's Junior World Handball Championship.

== Preliminary round ==
All times are local (UTC–6).

=== Group A ===
Pos	Team	Pld	W	D	L	GF	GA	GD	Pts	Qualification
1	United States	2	2	0	0	60	43	+17	4	Semifinals
2	Guadeloupe	2	1	0	1	55	54	+1	2	Semifinals
3	Greenland	2	0	0	2	43	61	−18	0	Placement round

Source: NACHC
Rules for classification: 1) Points; 2) Head-to-head points; 3) Head-to-head goal difference; 4) Head-to-head goals scored; 5) Goal difference; 6) Goals scored; 7) Draw.

12 December 2022; 14:00	United States	31–18	Greenland	Mexican Olympic Sports Center, Mexico City
12 December 2022; 14:00		(12–5)		Mexican Olympic Sports Center, Mexico City
12 December 2022; 14:00		Report		Mexican Olympic Sports Center, Mexico City

13 December 2022; 14:00	Greenland	25–30	Guadeloupe	Mexican Olympic Sports Center, Mexico City
13 December 2022; 14:00		(12–16)		Mexican Olympic Sports Center, Mexico City
13 December 2022; 14:00		Report		Mexican Olympic Sports Center, Mexico City

14 December 2022; 14:00	United States	29–25	Guadeloupe	Mexican Olympic Sports Center, Mexico City
14 December 2022; 14:00		(18–13)		Mexican Olympic Sports Center, Mexico City
14 December 2022; 14:00		Report		Mexican Olympic Sports Center, Mexico City

=== Group B ===
Pos	Team	Pld	W	D	L	GF	GA	GD	Pts	Qualification
1	Cuba	3	3	0	0	116	70	+46	6	Semifinals
2	Martinique	3	2	0	1	85	77	+8	4	Semifinals
3	Mexico (H)	3	1	0	2	97	90	+7	2	Placement round
4	Puerto Rico	3	0	0	3	61	122	−61	0	Placement round

Source: NACHC
Rules for classification: 1) Points; 2) Head-to-head points; 3) Head-to-head goal difference; 4) Head-to-head goals scored; 5) Goal difference; 6) Goals scored; 7) Draw.
(H) Hosts

12 December 2022; 16:00	Martinique	19–32	Cuba	Mexican Olympic Sports Center, Mexico City
12 December 2022; 16:00		(10–17)		Mexican Olympic Sports Center, Mexico City
12 December 2022; 16:00		Report		Mexican Olympic Sports Center, Mexico City

12 December 2022; 18:00	Mexico	40–22	Puerto Rico	Mexican Olympic Sports Center, Mexico City
12 December 2022; 18:00		(18–12)		Mexican Olympic Sports Center, Mexico City
12 December 2022; 18:00		Report		Mexican Olympic Sports Center, Mexico City

13 December 2022; 16:00	Puerto Rico	19–36	Martinique	Mexican Olympic Sports Center, Mexico City
13 December 2022; 16:00		(11–16)		Mexican Olympic Sports Center, Mexico City
13 December 2022; 16:00		Report		Mexican Olympic Sports Center, Mexico City

13 December 2022; 18:00	Cuba	38–31	Mexico	Mexican Olympic Sports Center, Mexico City
13 December 2022; 18:00		(20–16)		Mexican Olympic Sports Center, Mexico City
13 December 2022; 18:00		Report		Mexican Olympic Sports Center, Mexico City

14 December 2022; 16:00	Puerto Rico	20–46	Cuba	Mexican Olympic Sports Center, Mexico City
14 December 2022; 16:00		(10–20)		Mexican Olympic Sports Center, Mexico City
14 December 2022; 16:00		Report		Mexican Olympic Sports Center, Mexico City

14 December 2022; 18:00	Mexico	26–30	Martinique	Mexican Olympic Sports Center, Mexico City
14 December 2022; 18:00		(14–16)		Mexican Olympic Sports Center, Mexico City
14 December 2022; 18:00		Report		Mexican Olympic Sports Center, Mexico City

== Placement round ==
Pos	Team	Pld	W	D	L	GF	GA	GD	Pts
5	Mexico (H)	2	2	0	0	68	48	+20	4
6	Greenland	2	1	0	1	58	47	+11	2
7	Puerto Rico	2	0	0	2	41	72	−31	0

Source: NACHC
Rules for classification: 1) Points; 2) Head-to-head points; 3) Head-to-head goal difference; 4) Head-to-head goals scored; 5) Goal difference; 6) Goals scored; 7) Draw.
(H) Hosts

16 December 2022; 14:00	Greenland	32–19	Puerto Rico	Mexican Olympic Sports Center, Mexico City
16 December 2022; 14:00		(16–9)		Mexican Olympic Sports Center, Mexico City
16 December 2022; 14:00		Report		Mexican Olympic Sports Center, Mexico City

17 December 2022; 14:00	Greenland	26–28	Mexico	Mexican Olympic Sports Center, Mexico City
17 December 2022; 14:00		(14–12)		Mexican Olympic Sports Center, Mexico City
17 December 2022; 14:00		Report		Mexican Olympic Sports Center, Mexico City

== Knockout stage ==
=== Bracket ===
Semifinals
16 December
United States	34
Martinique	24
16 December
Guadeloupe	24
Cuba	36

Final
17 December
United States	23
Cuba	36
Third place
17 December
Martinique	46
Guadeloupe	23

=== Semifinals ===
16 December 2022; 16:00	United States	34–24	Martinique	Mexican Olympic Sports Center, Mexico City
16 December 2022; 16:00		(17–11)		Mexican Olympic Sports Center, Mexico City
16 December 2022; 16:00		Report		Mexican Olympic Sports Center, Mexico City

16 December 2022; 18:00	Guadeloupe	24–36	Cuba	Mexican Olympic Sports Center, Mexico City
16 December 2022; 18:00		(11–21)		Mexican Olympic Sports Center, Mexico City
16 December 2022; 18:00		Report		Mexican Olympic Sports Center, Mexico City

=== Third place game ===
17 December 2022; 16:00	Martinique	46–23	Guadeloupe	Mexican Olympic Sports Center, Mexico City
17 December 2022; 16:00		(21–12)		Mexican Olympic Sports Center, Mexico City
17 December 2022; 16:00		Report		Mexican Olympic Sports Center, Mexico City

=== Final ===
17 December 2022; 18:00	United States	23–36	Cuba	Mexican Olympic Sports Center, Mexico City
17 December 2022; 18:00		(9–18)		Mexican Olympic Sports Center, Mexico City
17 December 2022; 18:00		Report		Mexican Olympic Sports Center, Mexico City

== Final standings ==
Rank	Team
1st place, gold medalist(s)	Cuba
2nd place, silver medalist(s)	United States
3rd place, bronze medalist(s)	Martinique
4	Guadeloupe
5	Mexico
6	Greenland
7	Puerto Rico

Qualified for the 2023 Junior World Championship and the 2023 IHF Inter-Continental Trophy
Qualified for the 2023 Junior World Championship
