= Military time zone =

Use of time zones in the military

The military time zones are a standardized, uniform set of time zones for expressing time across different regions of the world, named after the NATO phonetic alphabet. The Zulu time zone (Z) is equivalent to Coordinated Universal Time (UTC) and is often referred to as the military time zone. The military time zone system ensures clear communication in a concise manner, and avoids confusion when coordinating across time zones. The Combined Communications-Electronics Board, representing the armed forces of Australia, Canada, New Zealand, the United Kingdom, and the United States, publishes the military time zone system as the ACP 121 standard. The armed forces of Austria and many nations in NATO use it.

== Description ==
Going east from the prime meridian at Greenwich, letters "Alfa" (Note: The official spelling is "Alfa", although this is often "corrected" to Alpha - see NATO phonetic alphabet § Design.) to "Mike" (skipping "J", see below) represent the 12 time zones with positive UTC offsets until reaching the international Date Line. Going west from Greenwich, letters "November" to "Yankee" represent zones with negative offsets.

The letters are typically used in conjunction with military time. For example, 6:00 a.m. in zone UTC−5 is written "0600R" and spoken "zero six hundred Romeo".

The numeric zone description or "plus and minus system" indicates the correction which must be applied to the time as expressed in order to convert to UTC. For example, the zone description for the Romeo time zone is +5. Therefore, adding 5 hours to 0600R produces the time in UTC, 1100Z.

Time zone name	Degrees longitude	Designation letter	Zone description	Offset
Alfa Time Zone	7.5 E to 22.5 E	A	−1	UTC+01:00
Bravo Time Zone	22.5 E to 37.5 E	B	−2	UTC+02:00
Charlie Time Zone	37.5 E to 52.5 E	C	−3	UTC+03:00
Delta Time Zone	52.5 E to 67.5 E	D	−4	UTC+04:00
Echo Time Zone	67.5 E to 82.5 E	E	−5	UTC+05:00
Foxtrot Time Zone	82.5 E to 97.5 E	F	−6	UTC+06:00
Golf Time Zone	97.5 E to 112.5 E	G	−7	UTC+07:00
Hotel Time Zone	112.5 E to 127.5 E	H	−8	UTC+08:00
India Time Zone (Note: Not to be confused with Indian Standard Time (UTC+05:30), the time zone used in India.)	127.5 E to 142.5 E	I	−9	UTC+09:00
Kilo Time Zone	142.5 E to 157.5 E	K	−10	UTC+10:00
Lima Time Zone	157.5 E to 172.5 E	L	−11	UTC+11:00
Mike Time Zone	172.5 E to 180	M	−12	UTC+12:00
November Time Zone	7.5 W to 22.5 W	N	+1 or −13	UTC−01:00, UTC+13:00
Oscar Time Zone	22.5 W to 37.5 W	O	+2	UTC−02:00
Papa Time Zone	37.5 W to 52.5 W	P	+3	UTC−03:00
Quebec Time Zone (Note: Not to be confused with Eastern Time Zone (UTC−5/UTC−4), the time zone used in nearly all of Quebec.)	52.5 W to 67.5 W	Q	+4	UTC−04:00
Romeo Time Zone	67.5 W to 82.5 W	R	+5	UTC−05:00
Sierra Time Zone	82.5 W to 97.5 W	S	+6	UTC−06:00
Tango Time Zone	97.5 W to 112.5 W	T	+7	UTC−07:00
Uniform Time Zone	112.5 W to 127.5 W	U	+8	UTC−08:00
Victor Time Zone	127.5 W to 142.5 W	V	+9	UTC−09:00
Whiskey Time Zone	142.5 W to 157.5 W	W	+10	UTC−10:00
X-ray Time Zone	157.5 W to 172.5 W	X	+11	UTC−11:00
Yankee Time Zone	172.5 W to 180	Y	+12	UTC−12:00
Zulu Time Zone	7.5 W to 7.5 E	Z	0	UTC+00:00

The letter "J" ("Juliett"), (Note: The official spelling is "Juliett" with two Ts - see NATO phonetic alphabet § Design.) originally skipped, may be used to indicate the observer's local time. The letter "L" was previously misidentified in some editions of U.S. Army publications, such as FM 5-0, as representing "Local" time, which conflicted with its established use for the Lima time zone (UTC+11). This error has been rectified in the latest edition of FM 5-0, released in May 2022, which no longer includes this incorrect usage.

The letter "N" is also used to designate zone −13; this is to provide for a ship in zone −12 keeping Daylight Saving Time.

The letter "Z" ("Zulu") indicates Coordinated Universal Time (UTC).

The ACP 121 standard actually refers to Greenwich Mean Time (GMT) as the base time standard, but UTC has superseded GMT as a more precise time standard, so the time offsets are commonly understood as UTC.

== History ==
Sandford Fleming devised a system assigning the letters A–Y excluding J to 1-hour time zones, which may have been the inspiration for the system.

The standard was first distributed by NATO as a note in 1950. The note states "This method is based on the systems in use in the Armed Forces of these countries and the United States". The British used a system of lettered zones, which was likely the direct influence.

RFC 733 published in 1977 allowed using military time zones in the Date: field of emails. RFC 1233 in 1989 noted that the signs of the offsets were specified as opposite the common convention (e.g. A=UTC−1 instead of A=UTC+1), and the use of military time zones in emails was deprecated in RFC 2822 in 2001. It is recommended to ignore such designations and treat all such time designations as UTC unless out-of-band information is present.

== See also ==
- Lists of time zones
- Time zone abolition
