= Time in Costa Rica =

Costa Rica has one time zone, which is located in the Central Time Zone, six hours behind Coordinated Universal Time (UTC). Costa Rica keeps the same time offset all days of the year, so it does not have daylight saving time.

== IANA time zone database ==
In the IANA time zone database Costa Rica has the following time zone:

- America/Costa_Rica
