= Thomas G. Shanks =

American computer programmer and author

Thomas G. Shanks (born April 9, 1942, in Lima, Ohio) is an American computer programmer, author, and time zone history researcher.

== Work ==
While working for a San Diego–based astrological computing company as programmer and research director, Shanks did extensive research in the field of worldwide time zone and daylight saving time history. He published the results of this research in the two volumes The American Atlas and The International Atlas. Shanks' published data are quoted frequently in the public domain IANA time zone database.
