= Chamorro Time Zone =

Time zone for Guam and Northern Mariana Islands

- Time zone
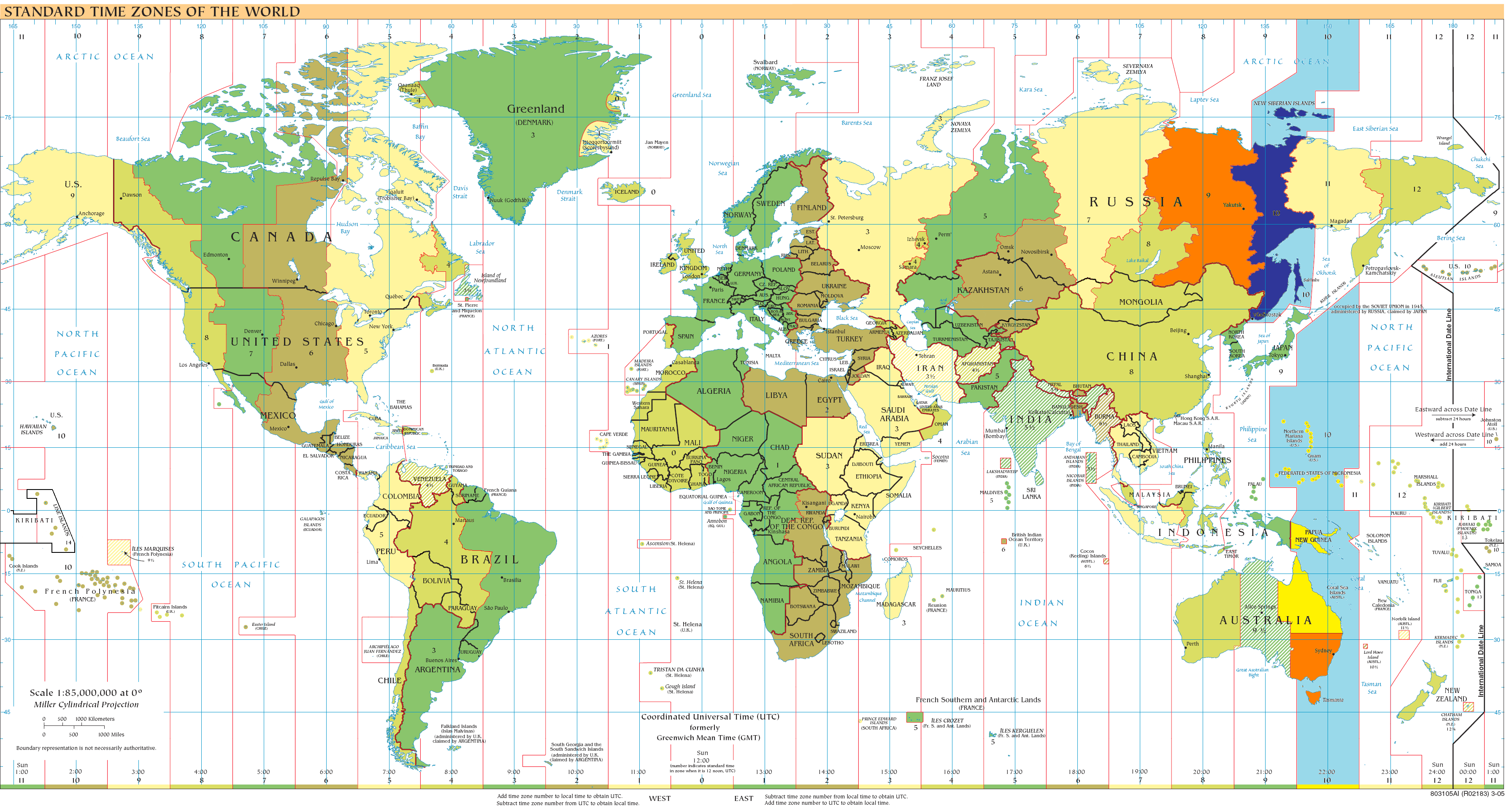
- UTC+10 highlighted on a world map.

UTC offset
- ChST: UTC+10:00

Current time
- :: ChST [refresh]

Observance of DST
- DST is not observed in this time zone.

The Chamorro Time Zone, formerly the Guam Time Zone, is a United States time zone which observes standard time ten hours ahead of Coordinated Universal Time (UTC+10:00). The clock time in this zone is based on the mean solar time of the 150th meridian east of the Greenwich Observatory.

The zone includes the U.S. territories of Guam and the Northern Mariana Islands, where the Chamorro people are the original inhabitants. Since Daylight Saving Time (DST) is not observed anywhere in this zone, the time is always known as Chamorro Standard Time (ChST).

The zone is two hours behind Wake Island Time Zone and 15 hours ahead of North American Eastern Time Zone. As of March 19, 2024 it is the easternmost (farthest ahead) time zone shown on the U.S. government's time.gov webpage. Although Wake, Howland and Baker Islands are U.S. territories in more easterly time zones (that are not shown), they are uninhabited.

Chamorro Standard Time shares the same time as Australian Eastern Standard Time. The State of Queensland also does not observe DST, so the Commonwealth of the Northern Mariana Islands (CNMI), Guam and Queensland are on the same time year round.

== Populated areas and major cities ==
- Hagåtña, Guam
- Saipan, Northern Mariana Islands

== History ==
The U.S. Congress formally created Chamorro Standard Time by federal Public Law 106-564 on December 23, 2000. Previously, Guam Standard Time existed per territorial Public Law 5-25 (1959). This statute is still on the territorial law books, although it is preempted by the federal law.

The Northern Mariana Islands, as part of the Trust Territory of the Pacific Islands, were not part of any American time zone prior to becoming a U.S. Commonwealth on January 1, 1978. Being directly north of Guam, however, they observed the same time.

== See also ==
- Time zone
- Time offset
- Wake Island Time Zone
- Samoa Time Zone
- Hawaii–Aleutian Time Zone
- Alaska Time Zone
- Pacific Time Zone
- Mountain Time Zone
- Central Time Zone
- Eastern Time Zone
- Atlantic Time Zone
- Time in the United States

== Sources ==
- Current time around the world
