= Lists of time zones =

These are lists of time zones.

- List of time zones by country – sorted by number of current time zones in the world
- List of UTC offsets – current UTC offsets
- List of time zone abbreviations
- List of tz database time zones – zones used by many computer systems, as defined by IANA
- List of military time zones
- List of time zones by U.S. state

== See also ==
- Category:Time by country
- Category:Time by continent
