= Alaska Time Zone =

Time zone in Alaska

- Time zone
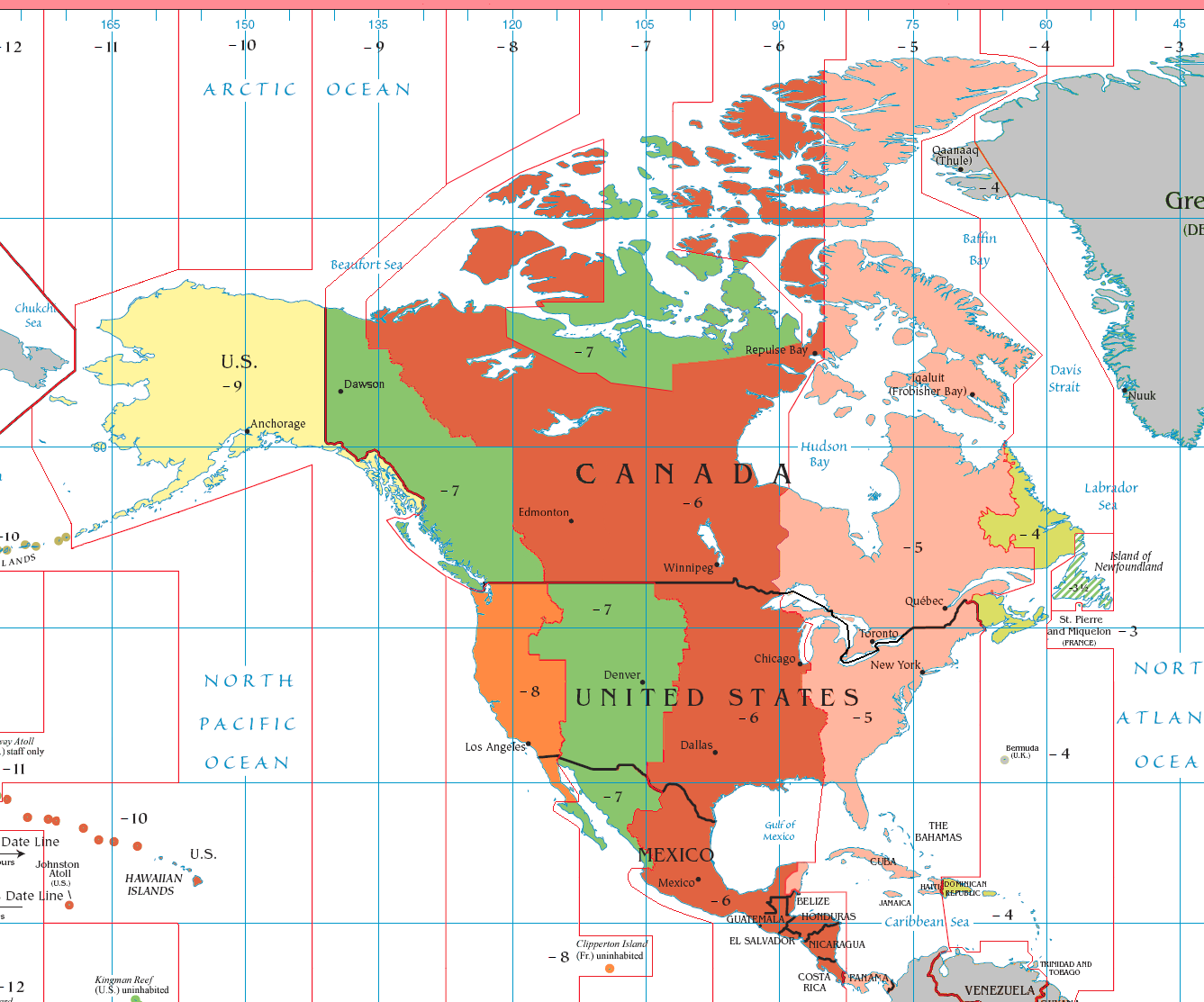

UTC offset
- AKST: UTC−09:00
- AKDT: UTC−08:00

Current time
- :: AKST [refresh] :: AKDT [refresh]

Observance of DST
- DST is observed throughout this time zone.

The Alaska Time Zone observes standard time by subtracting nine hours from Coordinated Universal Time (UTC−09:00). During daylight saving time its time offset is eight hours (UTC−08:00). The clock time in this zone is based on mean solar time at the 135th meridian west of the Greenwich Observatory.

The zone includes nearly all of the U.S. state of Alaska and is one hour behind the Pacific Time Zone.

- standard time: Alaska Standard Time (AKST)
- daylight saving time: Alaska Daylight Time (AKDT)

The western Aleutian Islands observe Hawaii–Aleutian Time, one hour behind the remainder of the state.

The largest city in the Alaskan Time Zone is Anchorage, Alaska. The Anchorage Metropolitan Area is the largest metropolitan area in the zone.

Effective from 2007, the local time changes from AKST to AKDT at 02:00 AKST to 03:00 AKDT on the second Sunday in March and returns at 02:00 AKDT to 01:00 AKST on the first Sunday in November. As such, Alaska spends most of the year on daylight saving time rather than standard time.

== History ==
Period in use	Time offset from UTC	Name of time
1900 – 1918	UTC−09:00 (including Aleutian Islands)	Alaska Standard Time
1918 – January 19, 1942	UTC−10:00	Alaska Standard Time
January 20, 1942 – September 30, 1945	UTC−09:00	Alaska War Time
September 30, 1945 – March 31, 1967	UTC−10:00	Alaska Standard Time
April 1, 1967 – 1983	UTC−10:00	Alaska–Hawaii Standard Time
1983 – present	UTC−09:00 (in Juneau)	Alaska Time Zone

Two time zones have been referred to as the "Alaska Time Zone": a zone based on UTC−10:00 that covered much of Central Alaska in the early 20th century, and a zone based on UTC−09:00 zone that has covered all of the state except the Aleutian Islands since 1983.

The Standard Time Act of 1918 authorized the Interstate Commerce Commission to define each time zone. The United States Standard Alaska Time was designated as UTC−10:00. Some references prior to 1967 refer to this zone as Central Alaska Standard Time (CAST) or as Alaska Standard Time (AKST). In 1966, the Uniform Time Act renamed the UTC−10:00 zone to Alaska-Hawaii Standard Time (AHST), effective April 1, 1967. This zone was renamed in 1983 to Hawaii–Aleutian Standard Time when the majority of Alaska was moved out of the zone.

Prior to 1983, the current Alaska Time Zone (UTC−09:00) was known as the Yukon Time Zone, observing Yukon Standard Time (YST). This time zone included Canada's Yukon Territory and a small portion of Alaska including Yakutat. The Alaska Panhandle communities were in the Pacific Time Zone, while most of the interior was on UTC−10:00. Nome and the Aleutians previously observed Bering Standard Time or UTC−11:00. In 1975, the Yukon Territory switched to Pacific Standard Time, leaving Yakutat the only land area in the zone.

With the consolidation of Alaska's four time zones into two in 1983, the entire state was in either a zone based on UTC−09:00 or UTC−10:00. The Yukon Time Zone based on UTC−09:00 was later renamed the Alaska Time Zone in 1984.

== Anomalies ==
The Alaska Time Zone applies to the territory of the state of Alaska east of 169°30′ W, that is, the entire state minus the westernmost portions of the Aleutian Islands. Solar time zones are 15° wide.

UTC−09:00 time corresponds to the solar time at 9 × 15° = 135° W (roughly, Juneau, which is in the southeast panhandle). Thus, the westernmost locales of the Alaska Time Zone are off by up to 169°30′ − 135° = 34°30′ from local solar time, or slightly more than 2 hours and 17 minutes. At noon Alaskan Time at a location just east of 169°30′ W, local solar time is only about 9:42 a.m. The sun will not reach culmination for another 2 hours and 18 minutes.

When UTC−08:00 is applied in the summer (because of daylight saving time), this effect becomes even more apparent. For example, on June 12 at noon AKDT, the solar time at the extreme westerly points of the Alaskan time zone will be only 8:42 a.m., nearly 3 hours and 18 minutes behind clock time.

Very few people notice this, however, as these locations are virtually uninhabited, and for the very few people who do live there, the long days in the summer and short days in the winter make the sunrise and sunset times less important than areas closer to the equator. By contrast, in Juneau, which is much closer to the 135° west meridian, mean solar noon occurs around 11:57 a.m., very close to noon on the clock.

In Anchorage, visitors from more southerly latitudes are often surprised to see the sun set at 11:41 p.m. on the summer solstice while the solar time is 9:41 p.m. Anchorage is at 150° W, one hour further west from the solar time for UTC−09:00. Thus, Anchorage is one solar hour behind the legal time zone and observes daylight saving time as well for a two-hour discrepancy between legal time and solar time. Some local residents refer to this phenomenon as "double daylight time".

In Fairbanks, the same circumstances cause sunset to occur at 12:47 a.m. the next calendar day and the solar sunset is at 10:47 p.m. Even without daylight saving time, another anomaly is that on the winter solstice in Nome, the sunrise is after "noon" clock time, at 12:02 p.m., about 4 hours before sunset at 3:56 p.m.

The territory of the state of Alaska spans almost as much longitude as the contiguous United States (57.5° vs. 57.6°) so the use of only two time zones will inevitably lead to some distortions. Alaska would naturally fall into five time zones, with the greatest territory more correctly in UTC−10:00 and UTC−11:00, with Adak more correctly in UTC–12:00 and Cape Wrangell in UTC–13:00 as sunset can be late as midnight. But political and logistical considerations have led to the use of two time zones, leading to the distortions mentioned above.

== Cities ==
- Anchorage, Alaska
- Fairbanks, Alaska
- Juneau, Alaska

== See also ==
- Alaska Purchase
- Effects of time zones on North American broadcasting
- International Date Line
- Time in Alaska
- Time zone
