= Samoa Time Zone =

Pacific time zone legislated for US terriritories

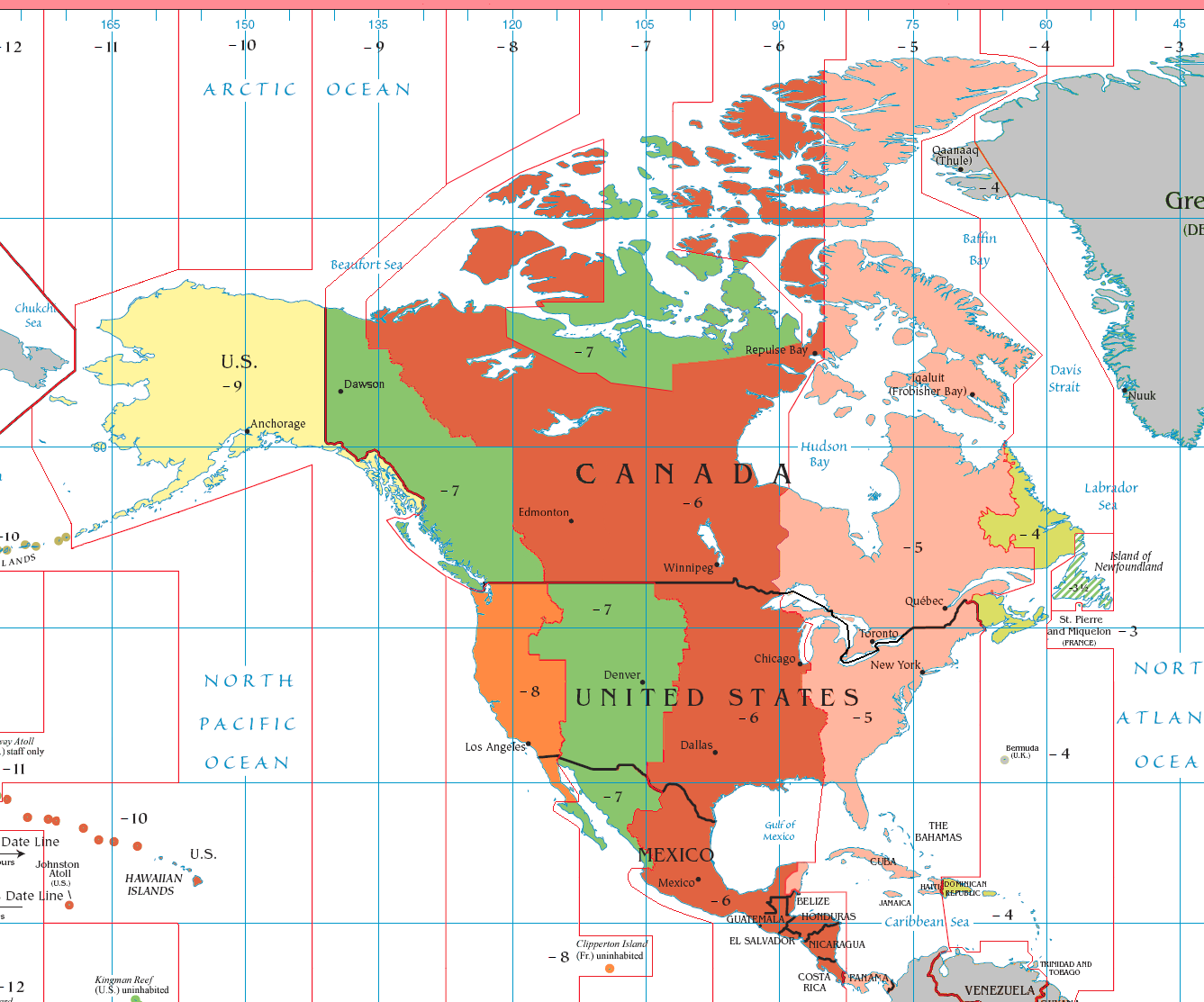
SST is UTC−11:00

The Samoa Time Zone or Samoa Standard Time (SST) observes standard time by subtracting eleven hours from Coordinated Universal Time (UTC−11:00). The clock time in this zone is based on the mean solar time of the 165th meridian west of the Greenwich Observatory.

The zone includes the U.S. territory of American Samoa, as well as the Midway Islands and the uninhabited islands of Jarvis, Palmyra, and Kingman Reef. It also includes the country of Niue.

The zone is one hour behind Hawaii–Aleutian Time Zone and one hour ahead of the Howland and Baker islands, and 23 hours behind Wake Island Time Zone.

The nation of Samoa also observed the same time as the Samoa Time Zone until it moved across the International Date Line at the end of 29 December 2011; Samoa was then 24 hours ahead of American Samoa, although the time difference varied seasonally until 2021 when Samoa discontinued daylight saving time.

== Populated areas ==
- Pago Pago, American Samoa

== See also ==
- Time zone
- Time offset
- Chamorro Time Zone
- Wake Island Time Zone
- Hawaii–Aleutian Time Zone
- Central Time Zone
- Eastern Time Zone
- Atlantic Time Zone
- Newfoundland Time Zone

== Sources ==
- Current time around the world
