= Time in Wake Island =

Time zone

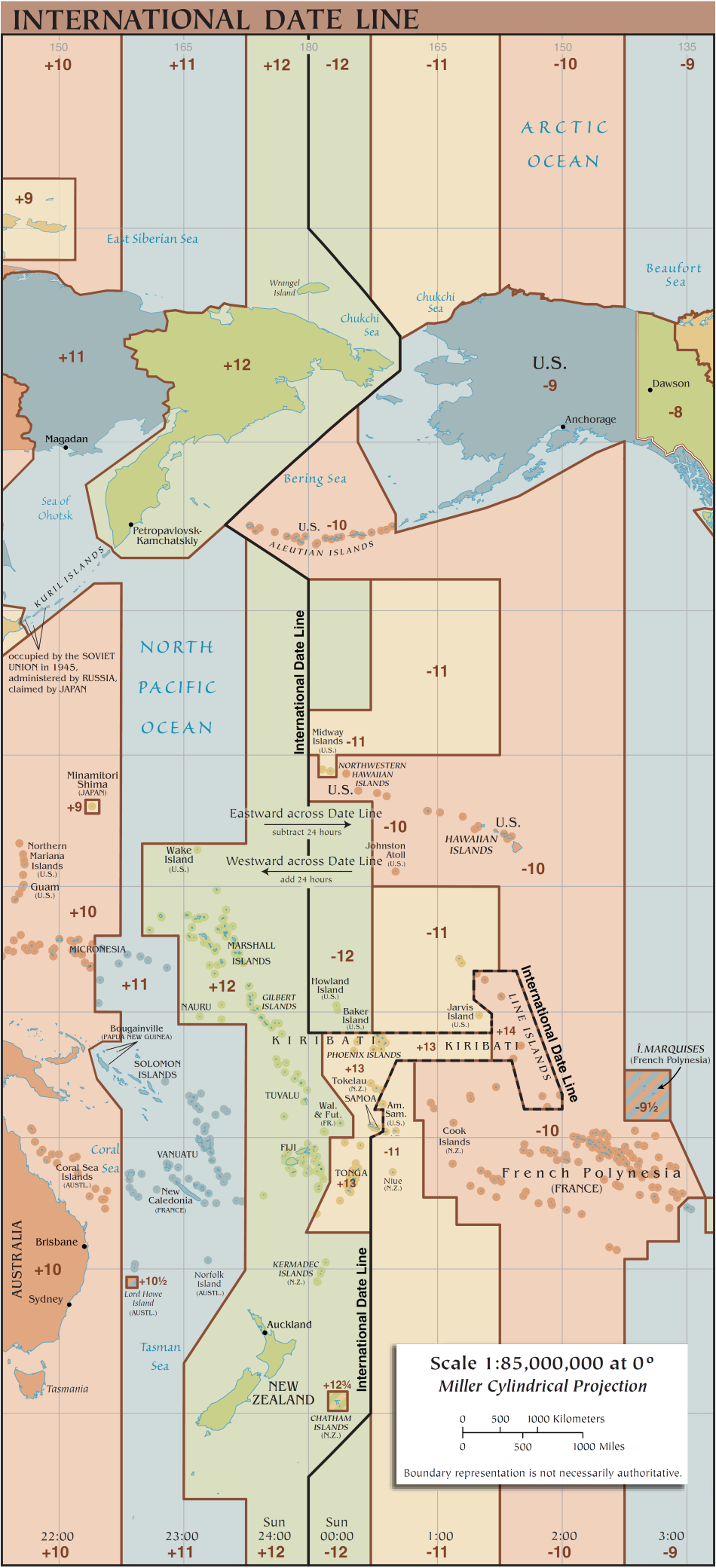
Map of time zones surrounding the International Date Line. Wake Island is north of the Marshall Islands, to the west of the Date Line in the North Pacific Ocean.

The U.S. territory of Wake Island locally observes standard time by adding twelve hours to Coordinated Universal Time (UTC+12:00). It is two hours ahead of Chamorro Time Zone, 17 hours ahead of North American Eastern Standard Time, 23 hours ahead of Samoa Time Zone, and 24 hours ahead of Howland and Baker Islands.

== See also ==
- Time offset
- Hawaii–Aleutian Time Zone
- Pacific Time Zone
