= Standard Time Act =

United States time zone and Daylight Saving Time law

- Long title: An Act to save daylight and to provide standard time for the United States.
- Nicknames: Calder Act; Standard Time Act of 1918
- Enacted by: the 65th United States Congress
- Effective: March 19, 1918

Citations
- Public law: Pub. L. 65–106
- Statutes at Large: 40 Stat. 450

Codification
- U.S.C. sections created: 15 U.S.C. ch. 6, subch. IX §§ 261–264

Legislative history
- Introduced in the Senate as S. 1854 by William M. Calder (R-NY); Passed the House on March 15, 1918 (253-40); Signed into law by President Woodrow Wilson on March 19, 1918

The Standard Time Act of 1918, also known as the Calder Act, was the first United States federal law implementing Standard time and Daylight saving time in the United States. It defined five time zones for the continental United States and authorized the Interstate Commerce Commission to define the limits of each time zone.

The section concerning daylight saving time was repealed by the act titled An Act For the repeal of the daylight-saving law, Pub. L. 66–40, 41 Stat. 280, enacted August 20, 1919, over President Woodrow Wilson's veto.

As a result of a 1966 amendment of Section 261 to add more time zones, the wording in Section 264 of the act wrongly placed most of the state of Idaho (south of the Salmon River) in UTC−06:00 CST (Central Standard Time), but was amended in 2007 by Congress to UTC−07:00 MST (Mountain Standard Time). MST was observed prior to the correction.

== See also ==
- Time in the United States
- Uniform Time Act
