= Daylight saving time in the United States =

Practice of setting the clock forward by one hour in the United states

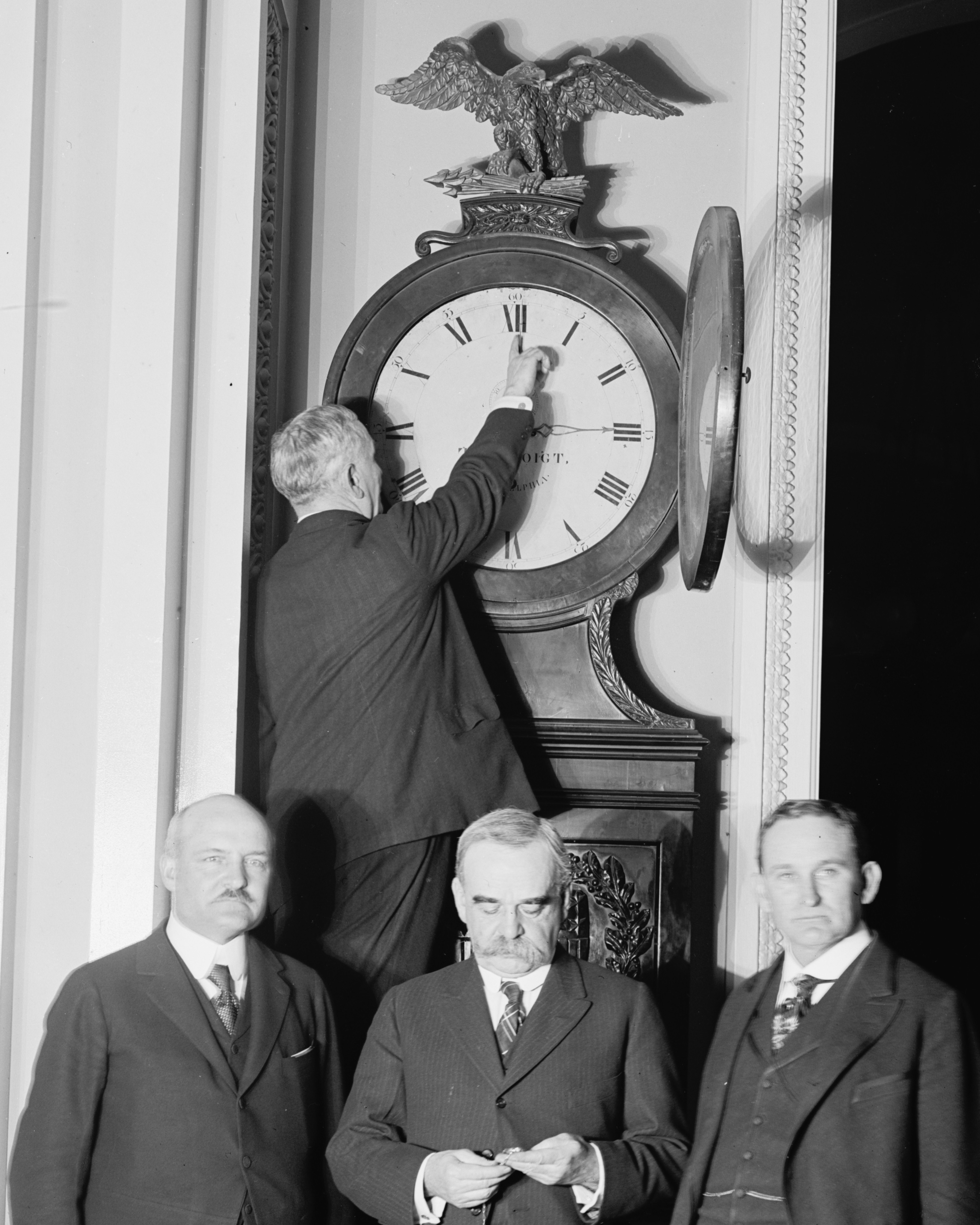
The Ohio Clock in the US Capitol being turned forward for the country's first daylight saving time on March 31, 1918, by the Senate sergeant at arms, Charles Higgins

Most of the United States observes daylight saving time (DST), the practice of setting the clock forward by one hour when there is longer daylight during the day, so that evenings have more daylight and mornings have less. Exceptions include Arizona (except for the Navajo Nation, which observes daylight saving time), Hawaii, and the territories of American Samoa, Guam, the Northern Mariana Islands, Puerto Rico, and the United States Virgin Islands. The Uniform Time Act of 1966 established a uniform set of rules for states opting to observe daylight saving time.

In the US, daylight saving time starts on the second Sunday in March and ends on the first Sunday in November, with the time changes taking place at 2:00 a.m. local time. With a mnemonic word play referring to seasons, clocks "spring forward, fall back"—that is, in springtime the clocks are moved forward from 2:00 a.m. to 3:00 a.m. and in fall they are moved back from 2:00 a.m. to 1:00 a.m. Daylight saving time lasts for a total of 34 weeks (238 days) every year, about 65% of the entire year.

Federal law supports states that opt to switch between standard time and daylight saving time, despite some unsuccessful efforts to do away with this practice. In 2022, the United States Senate passed the Sunshine Protection Act which would have permanently activated daylight saving time, but it did not become law, because it was not approved by the US House of Representatives. In 2026, the House passed a reintroduced version of the bill, but the Senate has yet to approve it.

The following table lists recent past and near future starting and ending dates of daylight saving time in the United States (in states that observe daylight saving time):

Year	Start	End
2023	March 12	November 5
2024	March 10	November 3
2025	March 9	November 2
2026	March 8	November 1
2027	March 14	November 7
2028	March 12	November 5
2029	March 11	November 4

== History of DST in the United States ==
Benjamin Franklin proposed a form of daylight time in 1784. Writing as an anonymous "subscriber", his tongue-in-cheek essay "An Economical Project for Diminishing the Cost of Light", written to the editor of The Journal of Paris, observed that Parisians could save on candles by getting out of bed earlier in the morning, making use of the natural morning light instead. By his calculations, the total savings by the citizens of Paris would be the approximate equivalent of $200 million today. Franklin's suggestion seems to have been more of a joke than a real proposal, and nothing came of it.

=== 1916–1966: Early, inconsistent use ===
Poster: Saving daylight ends, for 1918, Sunday, Oct 27^{th} – "Good-bye, Uncle- see you next spring"

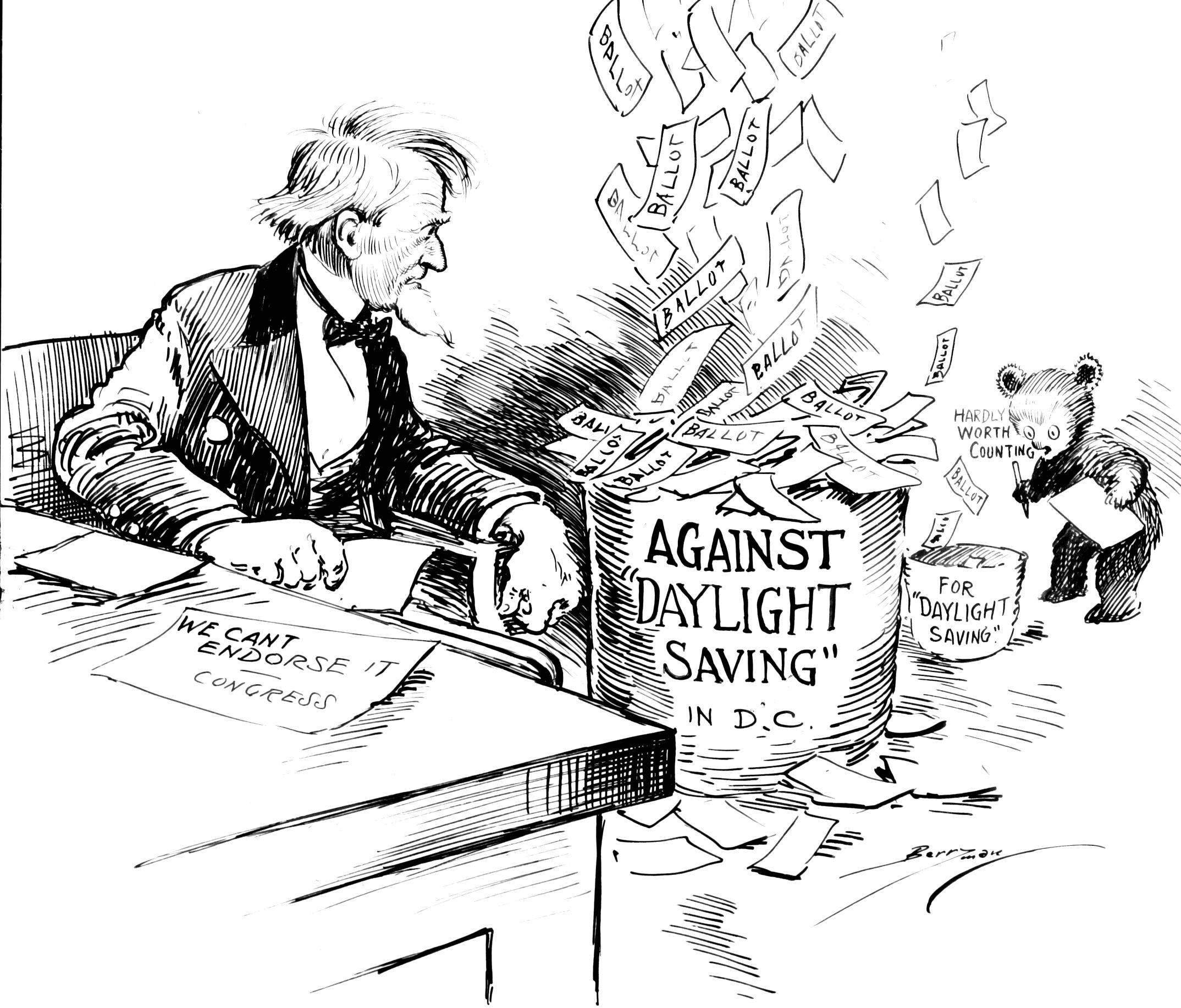
In a 1922 political cartoon by Clifford K. Berryman, Uncle Sam considers opposition to daylight saving time.

During World War I, in an effort to conserve fuel, Germany began observing DST on May 1, 1916, and the rest of Europe soon followed. The plan was not adopted in the United States until the Standard Time Act of March 19, 1918, which confirmed the existing standard time zone system and set summer DST to begin on March 31, 1918 (reverting October 27). The idea was unpopular, especially with farmers because DST meant they had less time in the morning to get their milk and harvested crops to market. Congress abolished DST after the war, overriding President Woodrow Wilson's veto. DST became a local option. New York City continued to observe a metropolitan DST, while rural areas outside the city did not. Because of NYC's position as a financial capital, other places followed. A nationwide DST would not be established again until World War II. On February 9, 1942, President Franklin Roosevelt instituted year-round DST, called "War Time". It lasted until the last Sunday (the 30th) in September 1945. After 1945, many states and cities east of the Mississippi River (and mostly north of the Ohio and Potomac rivers) adopted summer DST.

From 1945 to 1966, there was no federal law on daylight saving time, so localities could choose when it began and ended or drop it entirely. A complicated patchwork of daylight saving policies that varied in length and by city, state, and municipality emerged. As of 1954, only California and Nevada had state-wide DST west of the Mississippi, and only a few cities between Nevada and St. Louis. In the 1964 Official Railway Guide, 21 of the 48 contiguous states had no DST anywhere. By 1965, there were 18 states that observed daylight saving for six months each year, eighteen states that did not have formal policies but had cities or towns with their own daylight saving standards and another 12 states that did not implement daylight saving at all. Meanwhile, portions of North Dakota and Texas observed a sort of "reverse" daylight saving time, essentially setting their clocks back an hour rather than moving them forward.

=== 1967–1972: Federal standard established ===
By 1962, the transportation industry found the lack of consistency confusing enough to push for federal regulation. The result was the Uniform Time Act of 1966, signed by President Lyndon Johnson on April 14. Beginning in 1967, the act mandated standard time within the established time zones and provided for advanced time: Clocks would be advanced one hour beginning at 2:00 a.m. on the last Sunday in April and turned back one hour at 2:00 a.m. on the last Sunday in October. States were allowed to exempt themselves from DST as long as the entire state did so. If a state chose to observe DST, the time changes were required to begin and end on the established dates. The act also required states that used daylight saving time in 1966 to follow the same schedule. The newly created United States Department of Transportation was given power to enforce the law.

In 1967, Arizona and Michigan became the first states to exempt themselves from DST (Michigan began observing DST in 1972). In 1972, the act was amended, allowing those states split between time zones to exempt either the entire state or that part of the state lying within a different time zone.

As of March 2023, the following states and territories do not observe DST: Arizona, Hawaii, American Samoa, Guam, The Northern Mariana Islands, Puerto Rico, and the Virgin Islands.

=== 1973–1975: Year-round experiment ===
During the 1973 oil embargo by the Organization of Arab Petroleum Exporting Countries (OAPEC), in an effort to conserve fuel, Congress enacted a trial period of year-round DST beginning January 6, 1974, and ending April 27, 1975. The trial was hotly debated. Those in favor pointed to increased daylight hours in the winter evening: more time for recreation, reduced lighting and heating demands, reduced crime, and reduced automobile accidents. The opposition was concerned about children leaving for school in the dark and the construction industry was concerned about morning accidents. After several morning traffic accidents involving schoolchildren in Florida, including eight children who were killed, Governor Reubin Askew asked for the year-round law to be repealed.

Over three months from December to March, public support dropped from 79% to 42%. Some schools moved their start times later. Shortly after the end of the Watergate scandal caused a change of administration, the act was amended (Pub. L. 93–434, 88 Stat. 1209, enacted October 5, 1974) to return to standard time for four months, beginning October 27, 1974, and ending February 23, 1975, when DST resumed. When the trial ended in October 1975, the country returned to observing summer DST (with the aforementioned exceptions).

=== 1975–1986: Extension of daylight saving time ===
The DOT, evaluating the plan of extending DST into March, reported in 1975 that "modest overall benefits might be realized by a shift from the historic six-month DST (May through October) in areas of energy conservation, overall traffic safety and reduced violent crime." However, DOT also reported that these benefits were minimal and difficult to distinguish from seasonal variations and fluctuations in energy prices.

Congress then asked the National Bureau of Standards to evaluate the DOT report. Its report, "Review and Technical Evaluation of the DOT Daylight Saving Time Study" (April 1976), found no significant energy savings or differences in traffic fatalities. It did find statistically significant evidence of increased fatalities among school-age children in the mornings during the four-month period January–April 1974 as compared with the same period (non-DST) of 1973. NBS stated that it was impossible to determine how much, if any, of this increase was due to DST. When these data were compared between 1973 and 1974 for the months of March and April, no significant difference was found in fatalities among school-age children in the mornings.

In 1986, Congress enacted P.L. 99-359, amending the Uniform Time Act by changing the beginning of DST from last Sunday in April to the first Sunday in April and having the end remain the last Sunday in October. These start and end dates were in effect from 1987 to 2006. The time was adjusted at 2:00 a.m. local time.

=== 2005–2009: Second extension ===
By the Energy Policy Act of 2005, daylight saving time (DST) was extended in the United States beginning in 2007. From that year, DST begins on the second Sunday of March and ends on the first Sunday of November. In years when April 1 falls on Monday through Wednesday, these changes result in a DST period that is five weeks longer; in all other years the DST period is four weeks longer.

Under Section 110 of the act, the US Department of Energy was required to study the impact of the 2007 DST extension no later than nine months after the change took effect. The report, released in October 2008, reported nationwide electricity savings of 0.03% for the year 2007.

An October 2008 study conducted by the University of California at Santa Barbara for the National Bureau of Economic Research found that the 2006 DST adoption in Indiana increased energy consumption in Indiana by an average of 1%. Although consumption for lighting dropped by 4.5% as a result of the DST adoption, consumption for heating and cooling increased 2% to 10%. The cost to the average Indiana household of the DST adoption was determined to be $3.29 per year, for an aggregate cost of $1.7 million to $5.5 million per year.

The United States Chamber of Commerce has praised the extension of daylight saving under the 2005 law, which increased the amount of shopping and commerce after work in the evenings. In the golf industry, the group has noted an exceptional increase in revenue of "$200 million in additional sales of golf clubs and greens fees". The extension of daylight saving has also had a notable impact on Halloween and candy sales. Wyoming senator Michael Enzi and Michigan representative Fred Upton advocated the extension from October into November especially to allow children to go trick-or-treating in more daylight. In some areas, the extension of daylight saving time in March and November has pushed back sunrise to as late as 8:30 a.m.

=== 2015–present: Proposals for the introduction of year-round DST ===
Several state and federal representatives have advanced legislation in support of the legalization of using daylight saving time as the year-round clock option. Bills have been introduced in more than 30 states to end DST or make it permanent.

The main argument for introducing year-round DST is that the lifestyles and work patterns of modern-day citizens are no longer compatible with the concept of shifting the clock every spring and fall. Supporters also argue that switching to ''Forward Time'' would also result in saving energy by reducing the need for artificial light.

In 2015, the Nevada Senate passed Nevada Assembly Joint Resolution 4, which urged Congress to enact legislation allowing individual states to establish daylight saving time as the standard time in their respective states throughout the calendar year. This would mean that Nevada (except West Wendover) would officially be on the same time as most of Arizona all year, and would be an hour ahead of California in the winter. The United States Congress has not yet enacted any enabling legislation in this regard. On March 6, 2018, the Florida Senate approved the Sunshine Protection Act which would put Florida on permanent daylight saving time year round, and Governor Rick Scott signed it March 23. Congress would need to amend the existing 1966 federal law to allow the change. In November 2018, voters in California ratified a legislative plan which would allow for year-round daylight saving time to be enacted. However, it still requires the vote of two-thirds of the state's legislature and the approval of Congress.

The Sunshine Protection Act of 2019 was introduced in the US Senate by Senator Marco Rubio of Florida to make the times used for DST standard time and abolish DST. It has bipartisan support from senators from Washington and Tennessee, but it had not received a hearing in the Senate's Commerce, Science, and Transportation committee for years.

In 2019, the Washington State Legislature passed Substitute House Bill 1196, which would establish year-round observation of daylight saving time contingent on the United States Congress amending federal law to authorize states to observe daylight saving time year-round. The bill passed, and was followed by proposed 2021 ballot initiative 1803 to petition the US Congress to authorize the change. Tennessee and Oregon also passed bills in 2019 for year-round DST, and legislative houses in Alabama and Arkansas also approved resolutions in favor. Oregon never adopted the measure, and a subsequent effort in 2024 also failed. Georgia Governor Brian P. Kemp signed Senate Bill 100 providing for year-round daylight saving time when the United States Congress amends 15 U.S.C. Section 260a to authorize states to observe daylight saving time year-round.

On March 15, 2022, the US Senate passed the Sunshine Protection Act by unanimous consent. This change would have meant that daylight saving time zones would no longer return to standard time and remain on DST year-round. It would have started November 5, 2023. However, it was not passed by the House of Representatives. The American Academy of Sleep Medicine has opposed the Sunshine Protection Act and called instead for permanent standard time, a position supported by the American College of Chest Physicians and the World Sleep Society, among others. On January 3, 2023, the 117th Congress ended without the House voting on the Sunshine Protection Act. The American public is split on the subject: only 21% of Americans prefer changing clocks twice per year, 62% prefer to keep the time the same, while 17% are undecided. Of the 62% that would prefer to see the changing of the clocks eliminated, 50% favor permanent daylight saving time and 31% support permanent standard time.

As of November 2023, a number of state bills have been introduced, and a bill in the US Senate has been reintroduced. None have passed in Congress. Until a DST bill is passed in both the US Senate and the US House of Representatives, and then signed into law by the President, nowhere in the US will have permanent daylight time (and standard time is mandatory in all parts of the country, for either the "winter months" or the full year, depending on state law). Most of the United States will continue to change clocks twice a year.

In 2026, a reintroduced Sunshine Protection Act passed the House by a vote of 308-117, but still requires passage in the Senate to become law.

=== 2022–present: New science on time policy ===
In response to legislation, such as the Sunshine Protection Act, multiple scientific societies, such as the American Medical Association, Sleep Research Society, American Academy of Sleep Medicine, Society for Research on Biological Rhythms, and National Sleep Foundation have all released statements in favor of a permanent time policy and recommending permanent standard time. At the time the release of these statements, most supporting research had focused on the acute consequences of switching time policies. Studies had found increases in traffic accidents and cardiovascular events as well as decreased vigilance and workplace engagement, primarily during the "spring ahead" transition. However, there was little work examining the long-term consequences of time policy or the magnitude of impact, all of which factor into policy decisions.

In 2025, a Stanford study compared the year-long circadian health impact of permanent Standard Time, permanent Daylight Saving Time, and semiannually switching in the continental U.S. using models of the human circadian rhythm and health data from the CDC Places dataset. Researchers found that switching to permanent Standard Time was predicted to reduce cases of obesity by 2.6 million cases and stroke by 300,000 cases. Permanent Daylight Saving Time also reduced cases but to a lesser extent. In interviews, the authors caution that this work is from a circadian health perspective and that other factors should be considered in policy decisions such as economic and safety impacts of time policy.

== Procedure for modifications ==
=== Changing an area's time zone ===
Under the Standard Time Act of 1918, as amended by the Uniform Time Act of 1966, moving a state or an area within a state from one time zone to another requires a regulation issued by DOT. The governor or state legislature may initiate a request for the state or any part of the state; the highest elected officials in the county may make a request for that county. The standard in the statute for such decisions is the convenience of commerce in that area. The convenience of commerce is defined broadly to consider such circumstances as the shipment of goods within the community; the origin of television and radio broadcasts; the areas where most residents work, attend school, worship, or receive health care; the location of airports, railway, and bus stations; and the major elements of the community's economy.

After receiving a request for altering a time zone, DOT determines whether it meets the requirement of minimum statutory criteria before issuing a notice of proposed rulemaking, soliciting public comment and scheduling a public hearing. Usually the hearing is held in the area requesting the change so that all affected parties can be represented. After the close of the comment period, the comments are reviewed and appropriate final action taken. If the secretary agrees that the statutory requirement has been met, the change is instituted, usually at the next changeover to or from DST.

=== Moving an area on or off DST ===
Under the Uniform Time Act, moving an area on or off DST is accomplished through legal action at the state level. Congress gives states two options: to either opt out of DST entirely or to switch to DST the second Sunday in March. Some states require legislation while others require executive action such as a governor's executive order. Information on procedures required in a specific state may be obtained from that state's legislature or governor's office. Although it may exempt itself, if a state decides to observe DST, the dates of observance must comply with federal legislation.

== Local DST observance ==
=== Alaska ===
Alaska observes DST. Due to its high latitude, Alaska has nearly round-the-clock daylight during summer, and DST is seen by some Alaskans as unnecessary and a nuisance. Another issue is that the Alaskan mainland's single time zone, which approximates solar time in the capital, Juneau, leads to a large disparity between civil time and solar time for much of the state, with solar noon occurring as late as 2:10 p.m. in the population centers of Anchorage and Fairbanks, and as late as 3:23 p.m. in places such as Nome. In Fairbanks, for example, sunset occurs well after civil midnight in the summer. Others argue that ending daylight saving time will place Alaska as much as five hours from Eastern Daylight Time, making coordination of travel and phone conversations more difficult.

=== Arizona ===
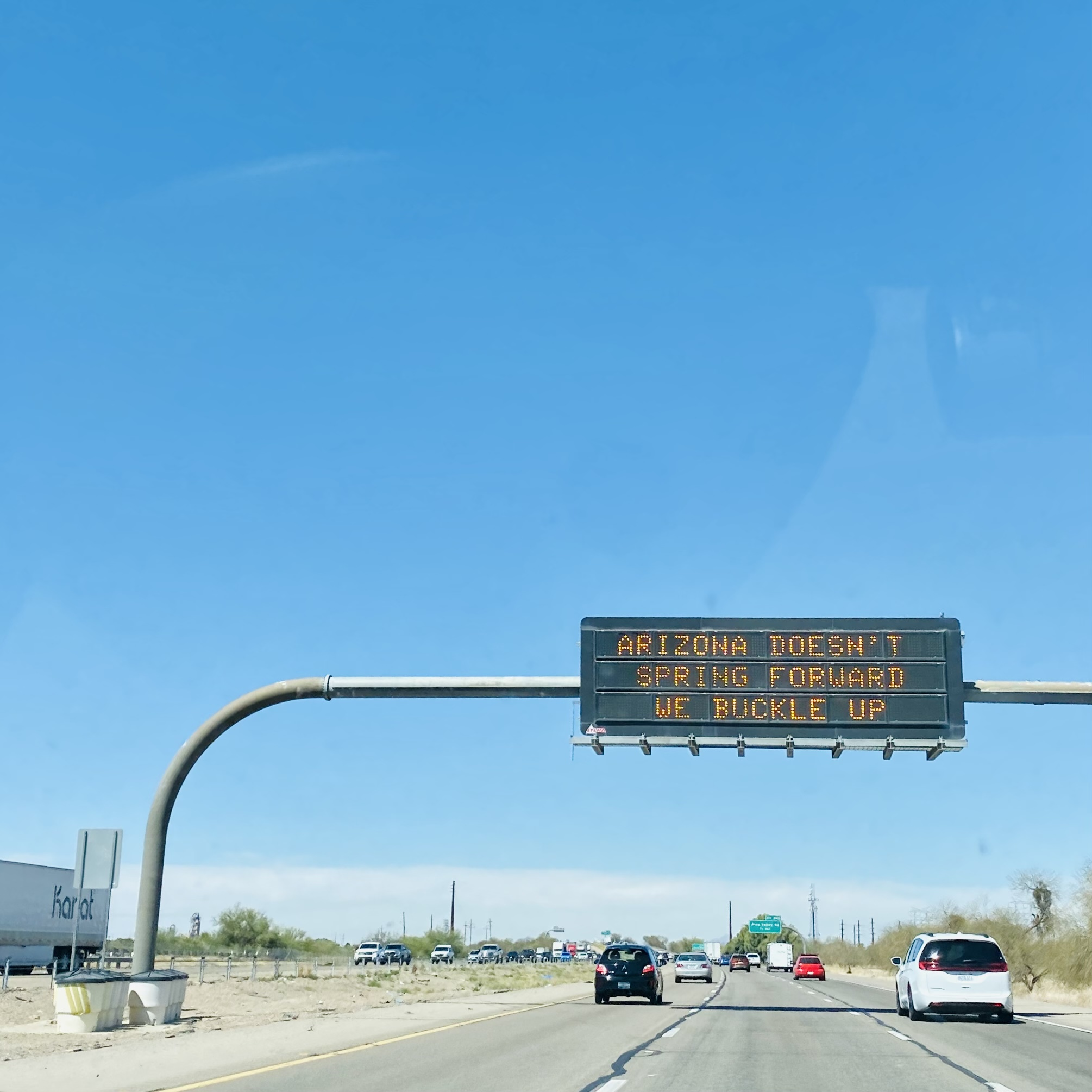
Arizona highway sign with notice for travelers about the local time standard, doubling as a traffic safety message about seat belt use

Arizona observed DST in 1967 under the Uniform Time Act because the state legislature did not enact an exemption statute that year. In March 1968, the DST exemption statute was enacted and the state of Arizona has not observed DST since 1967. This is in large part intended to conserve energy. Phoenix and Tucson are among the hottest US metropolitan areas during the summer, resulting in more power usage from air conditioning units and evaporative coolers in homes and businesses. An extra hour of sunlight while people are active would cause people to run their cooling systems longer, thereby using more energy.

The Navajo Reservation extends into Utah and New Mexico and observes daylight saving time to coordinate tribal affairs. The Hopi Reservation is entirely within the state of Arizona and is an enclave within the Navajo Indian Reservation, but does not observe DST.

Changes clocks semiannually Observes permanent standard time

=== California ===
California voters passed Proposition 12 in 1949, approving DST in the state.

California voters passed Proposition 7 on November 6, 2018 by a 60% vote. It gives the legislature power to: a) change DST measure by a two-thirds vote, thus repealing the 1949 Prop. 12; b) establish permanent year-round DST, pending federal authorization; and c) take action to change time policy concerning both DST and standard time. However, the state legislature never took action on Proposition 7.

=== Florida ===
Daylight saving time is less useful in Florida than in other states because its southern location leads to less variation in day length between winter and summer. Without DST, Miami, for instance, would experience sunrise and sunset times throughout the year similar to cities such as Honolulu or Hong Kong, neither of which observe DST. There is opposition to DST in Florida. State senator Bill Posey introduced a bill in March 2008 to abolish daylight time in the state and keep Florida on year-round standard time. However, in 2018, over 90% of the legislature voted for, and the governor approved, the Sunshine Protection Act to observe daylight saving time year-round if the U.S. Congress authorized states to do so. Because Florida straddles two time zones, the Florida legislature has the option of returning all or part of the state to standard time along time-zone boundaries.

=== Hawaii ===
Hawaii has never observed daylight saving time under the Uniform Time Act, having opted out of the act's provisions in 1967.

Because of Hawaii's tropical latitude, there is little variation in daylight length between winter and summer. Advancing the clock to UTC−09:00 (DST) in Hawaii would make sunrise times close to 7:00 a.m. even in June, because most of the inhabited islands are located close to the west end of the Hawaii–Aleutian Time Zone and Oahu, Kauai, and Niihau are located more than 7 degrees west of the Hawaii–Aleutian Time Zone's meridian and should, theoretically, be located in the next time zone to the west. (Until about 1946 Hawaiian standard time was based on longitude 157.5 degrees west rather than 150 degrees.)

On April 26, 1933, the Territorial Legislature enacted a bill placing Hawaii on daylight saving time from the last Sunday in April (April 30 in that year) to the last Sunday in September, but the law was repealed three weeks later on May 21, 1933. During World War II between February 9, 1942, and September 30, 1945, Hawaiian Standard Time was advanced one hour to so-called Hawaiian War Time, effectively placing the territory on year-round daylight saving time. In both cases where DST was used, Hawaii used UTC−09:30 during DST as standard time was 30 minutes behind.

=== Indiana ===
In 1918, following the approval of the Standard Time Act, Indiana was placed in the Central Time Zone. In 1949, the Indiana General Assembly outlawed daylight saving time and a new law was passed making Central Time the state's official time zone. In 1968, however, Time Life Broadcasting led and won a federal lawsuit for the observance of DST. Following, the assembly placed northwest and southwest Indiana in the Central Time Zone and the rest of the state on Eastern Time. From 1970 until 2006, most of Indiana in the Eastern Time Zone did not observe daylight saving time, but the entire state started to do so in April 2006, after eight counties in western Indiana were shifted from the Central Time Zone to the Eastern Time Zone. One goal for observing DST was to get more Indiana counties observing the same time zone; formerly, 77 counties observed year-round EST, five observed EST/EDT (the EDT usage being unofficial only), and 10 observed CST/CDT. As of 2016, Indiana has 12 counties observing Central Daylight Time while the remaining 80 counties observe Eastern Daylight Time. Those counties observing CST are in two groups: one near or in the Chicago metropolitan area, and the other around Evansville in the southwest corner of the state.

=== Michigan ===
In 1967, the Michigan Legislature adopted a statute, Act 6 of the Public Acts of 1967, exempting the state from the observance of DST. The exemption statute was suspended on June 14, 1967, however, when the referendum was invoked. From June 14, 1967, until the last Sunday in October 1967, Michigan observed DST, and did so in 1968 as well. The exemption statute was submitted to the voters at the General Election held in November 1968, and, in a close vote, the exemption statute was sustained. As a result, Michigan did not observe DST between 1969 and 1972. Radio station CKLW in Windsor, Ontario, across the river from Detroit, was popular on both sides of the border and as a result would often give both times on the air (e.g., "It's 4:30 in Detroit and 5:30 in Windsor"). In November 1972, an initiative measure, repealing the exemption statute, was approved by the voters. Michigan again observed DST in 1973 and has continued to do so since then.

The vast majority of Michigan is in the Eastern Time Zone. Only the Upper Peninsula counties that border Wisconsin (Gogebic, Iron, Dickinson, and Menominee) are in the Central Time Zone. However, given that the designated zone for Eastern Time is geographically skewed westward (as is the case with many timezones across the globe), Michigan is in reality located almost entirely within the boundaries of the Central Time Zone. Thus, it is accurate to say that the part of Michigan that observes Eastern Time is on daylight time during the "standard time" months and on double daylight time during the daylight time months.

In March 2024, a Michigan senate bill was introduced to let voters decide if the practice of changing clocks twice a year would remain law in Michigan. It has been referred to the Senate Committee on Government Operations for approval.

=== Texas ===
Due to its size, Texas is geographically located right between the Mountain Time Zone and the Central Time Zone, although due to the fact that time zones are naturally skewed westward, its designated standard time is Central Standard Time (CST, UTC-6) in all counties but El Paso and Hudspeth. However, with Texas' observance of DST, the large portion of Texas in the geographical Mountain Time Zone (west of 97.5° W) essentially undergoes "double daylight time" during DST, as it is during those periods two hours(+/- 30 minutes) ahead of solar time. A more logical solution would be to use Mountain Standard Time in the fall/winter and Central Standard Time in the spring/summer, which would allow both parts of Texas to observe solar time at some point during the year, but would still keep Texas on UTC-6 for most of the year, as DST is nearly 8 months long in the United States.

=== Other US locations ===
US territories American Samoa, Guam, Northern Mariana Islands, Puerto Rico, and the Virgin Islands lie in the tropics and do not observe DST.

While neighboring Samoa began observing DST in September 2010, the smaller American Samoa, likewise located in the Southern Hemisphere, cannot sensibly follow because of the March-to-November DST observation period mandated by the Uniform Time Act, which is inapplicable to the Southern Hemisphere as this period corresponds to wintertime. Thus, if American Samoa were to institute daylight saving time in accordance with the Uniform Time Act, it would "fall forward and spring back," so instead of the beginning of daylight saving time helping to capitalize on increasing daylight hours in the evening (as would be the case in the Northern Hemisphere in the spring) by setting clocks forward an hour, and instead of the end of daylight saving time mitigating the decreasing daylight hours in the morning (as would be the case in the Northern Hemisphere in the fall) by setting clocks back an hour, in American Samoa the beginning of daylight saving time would exacerbate the decreasing daylight hours in the morning from March to June by setting clocks ahead an hour, while the end of daylight saving time would further forfeit the benefit of increasing daylight hours in the evening from November to December by setting clocks back an hour.

== Time zones ==
US time zones, with abbreviations and UTC offsets
Time zone	Standard time	Daylight saving time
Eastern	EST (UTC−05:00)	EDT (UTC−04:00)
Central	CST (UTC−06:00)	CDT (UTC−05:00)
Mountain	MST (UTC−07:00)	MDT (UTC−06:00)
Pacific	PST (UTC−08:00)	PDT (UTC−07:00)
Alaska	AKST (UTC−09:00)	AKDT (UTC−08:00)
Hawaii–Aleutian	HST (UTC−10:00)	HDT (UTC−09:00); Aleutian Islands only

== See also ==
General topic

- Daylight saving time
- Daylight saving time by country
- History of time in the United States includes a list of historical daylight saving dates back to 1918
- Permanent time observation in the United States

Official civil time distribution

- CHU formerly distributed the official time in Canada but shut down in June 2026.
- WWV and WWVH (NIST Shortwave)
- WWVB (NIST Longwave)

Quasi-governmental time distribution systems

- CDMA cellphone stratum 2 time distribution system
- GNSS global navigation stratum 1 time distribution system
