= Pacific Time Zone =

North American time zone

- Time zone
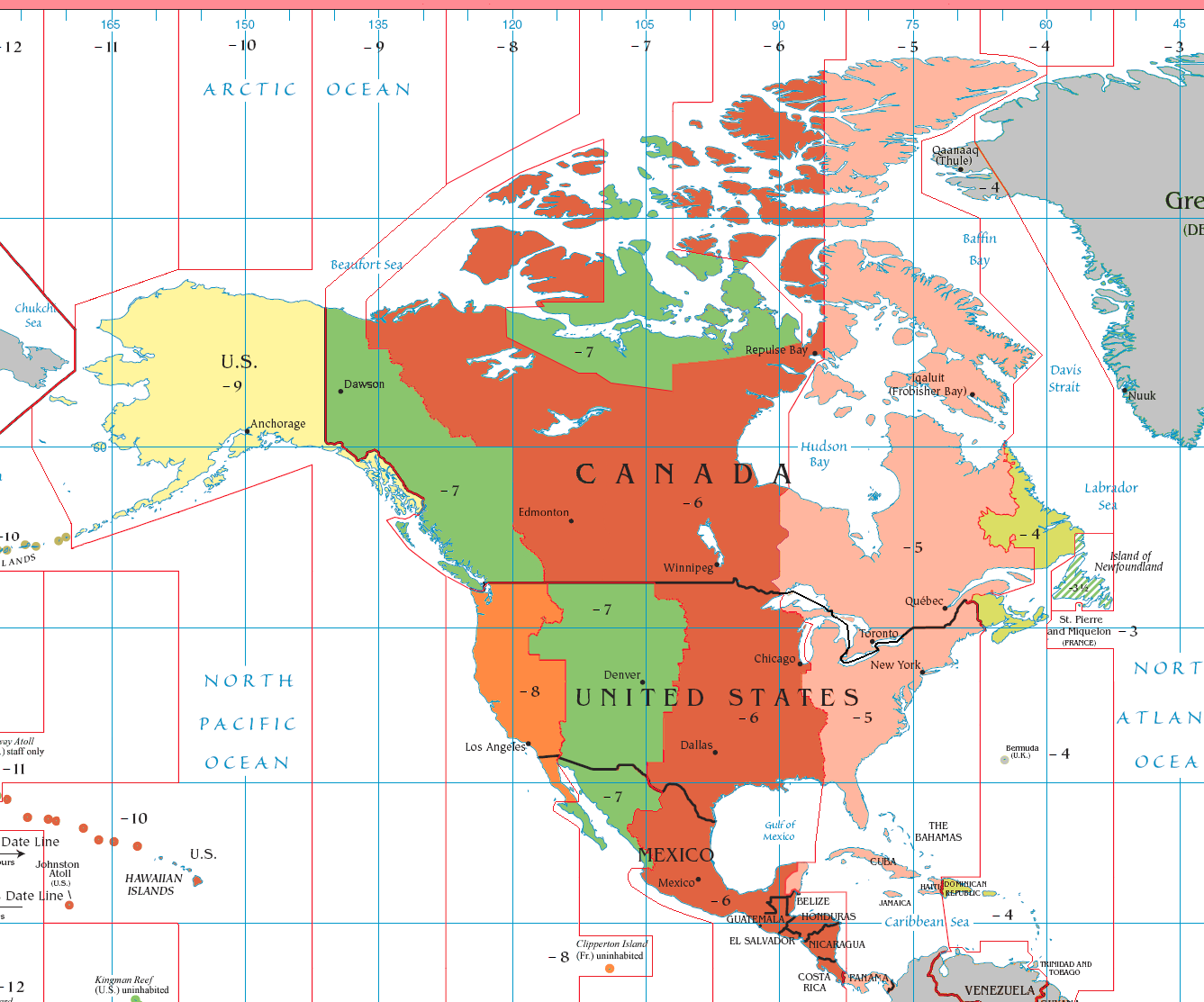
- Pacific Time Zone

UTC offset
- PST: UTC−08:00
- PDT: UTC−07:00

Current time
- :: PST [refresh]

Observance of DST
- DST is observed in some of this time zone.

The Pacific Time Zone (PT) is a time zone encompassing the western United States and northwestern Mexico. Places in this zone observe standard time by subtracting eight hours from Coordinated Universal Time (UTC−08:00). During daylight saving time, a time offset of UTC−07:00 is used instead.

In the United States, this time zone is generically called the Pacific Time Zone. Specifically, time in this zone is referred to as Pacific Standard Time (PST) when standard time is being observed (early November to mid-March), and Pacific Daylight Time (PDT) when daylight saving time (mid-March to early November) is being observed. In Mexico, the corresponding time zone is known as the Zona Noroeste (lit. 'Northwest Zone') and observes the same daylight saving schedule as the United States. The largest city in the Pacific Time Zone is Los Angeles, whose metropolitan area is also the largest in the time zone.

The zone is two hours ahead of the Hawaii–Aleutian Time Zone, one hour ahead of the Alaska Time Zone, one hour behind the Mountain Time Zone, (Note: While the state of Arizona lies entirely within the Mountain Time Zone, daylight saving time is only observed within the Navajo Nation; as a result, most of Arizona is aligned with the Pacific Time Zone from mid-March to early November.) two hours behind the Central Time Zone, three hours behind the Eastern Time Zone, and four hours behind the Atlantic Time Zone.

== Canada ==
The border between time zones in British Columbia was decided in a 1972 plebiscite held in northeastern and southeastern electoral districts due to their ties to neighbouring Alberta.

In March 2020, the Canadian territory of Yukon abolished Pacific Standard Time and adopted daylight saving time (UTC−07:00) year-round.

British Columbia announced in March 2026 that it would adopt daylight saving time (UTC−07:00) year-round, named Pacific Time (PCT) by the provincial government, beginning March 8, 2026, by bringing into force a law passed in 2019. This effectively aligned most of the province with the Yukon Time Zone already used in that territory.

The change did not affect the East Kootenay region, which continued to follow Mountain Standard Time and Mountain Daylight Time alongside Alberta before following Alberta's lead in adopting Alberta Time (UTC−06:00) year-round. The change did mean time in the Peace Region and Creston, which had previously adopted UTC−07:00 year-round, aligned with the bulk of the province.

== Mexico ==
In Mexico, the Zona Noroeste, which corresponds to Pacific Time in the United States, includes one state:

- Baja California

Parts of northern and western Mexico are in the Zona Pacifico (lit. 'Pacific Zone') and mostly do not observe daylight saving time. Thus, despite the name similarity to Pacific Time, Zona Pacifico is equivalent to either permanent Mountain Standard Time (as in Arizona) or permanent Pacific Daylight Time (as in British Columbia).

== United States ==
Two states are fully contained in the Pacific Time Zone:

- California
- Washington

Three states are split between the Pacific Time Zone and the Mountain Time Zone:

- Idaho – 10 counties in the Idaho Panhandle north of Hells Canyon and the Salmon River observe Pacific time, because of proximity to cities in Washington
- Nevada – all, except for West Wendover, because of proximity to Wendover, Utah and several towns along the Idaho border, including Jackpot, Jarbidge, Mountain City, and Owyhee.
- Oregon – all, except for the majority of Malheur County because of proximity to Idaho cities; it was moved in 1923 to accommodate the needs of the Oregon Short Line Railroad.

One state is split between the Pacific Time Zone (unofficially), the Alaska Time Zone, and the Hawaii–Aleutian Time Zone:

- Alaska – Hyder, unofficially uses Pacific time because of proximity to Stewart, British Columbia

== Daylight saving time ==
Through 2006, the local time (PST, UTC−08:00) changed to daylight time (PDT, UTC−07:00) at 02:00 LST (local standard time) to 03:00 LDT (local daylight time) on the first Sunday in April, and returned at 02:00 LDT to 01:00 LST on the last Sunday in October. The United States Congress passed the Energy Policy Act of 2005, which moved the local time changes from PST to PDT to the second Sunday in March and the reversal from PDT to PST to the first Sunday in November. Like other Canadian provinces that observe daylight time, British Columbia adopted the same dates in April 2006, to take effect in March 2007 alongside the U.S. Several Mexican states, including Baja California, implemented the new dates for the daylight time changes in 2010, ending a three-year period during which cities across the Mexico–United States border had a one-hour difference for two months a year. Baja California remains the only state in Mexico to fully observe daylight saving time.

Proposals to abolish the bi-annual time change and adopt year-round standard time or daylight time gained popularity among U.S. states in the 2010s. 59 percent of voters in California approved a 2018 ballot proposition that authorizes the legislature to use year-round daylight saving time, pending Congressional approval. The Washington State Legislature passed a bill in May 2019 that would move the state to permanent daylight time, subject to Congressional approval; the Oregon Legislative Assembly passed a similar bill a month later, while California's attempt failed. The provincial government of British Columbia announced in 2019 that they would follow the U.S. states in whether the time changes were kept or removed to maintain a unified time zone. In 2020, Idaho passed legislation to allow for permanent daylight time for the Pacific Time Zone. Congressional approval was sought through the Sunshine Protection Act, which was submitted several times and passed by the U.S. Senate in 2022, but its equivalent in the House of Representatives failed to pass.

In March 2026, British Columbia announced it would not wait for the U.S. Congress and would adopt daylight saving time (UTC−07:00) year-round first, now named Pacific Time by the provincial government.

== See also ==
- Effects of time zones on North American broadcasting
