= Time in British Columbia =

Time zones in Canada

Standard	DST	Time zone name (Note: The time zone column does not have legal meaning and may deviate from the government-designated name of the time zone.)
UTC−07:00 (year-round)		Mountain (Note: Year-round UTC−7 is referred to as Pacific Time (PCT) by the British Columbia government (not to be confused with Pacific Standard Time in the United States) and as Yukon Standard Time by the Yukon government.)
UTC−07:00	UTC−06:00	Mountain
UTC−06:00 (year-round)		Central (Note: Year-round UTC−6 is referred to as Alberta Time by the Alberta government and as Northwest Territories Time by the Northwest Territories government.)
UTC−06:00	UTC−05:00	Central
UTC−05:00 (year-round)		Eastern (Note: Year-round UTC−5 is referred to as Manitoba Standard Time (MBT) by the Manitoba government.)
UTC−05:00	UTC−04:00	Eastern
UTC−04:00 (year-round)		Atlantic
UTC−04:00	UTC−03:00	Atlantic
UTC−03:30	UTC−02:30	Newfoundland

Most of the Canadian province of British Columbia follows its own offset from Coordinated Universal Time (UTC), Pacific Time (PCT), which has been observed in most of the province since March 8, 2026. Pacific Time is observed by subtracting seven hours from UTC (UTC−07:00) year-round. While geographically the province is in the Pacific Time Zone (UTC−08:00), it is effectively on Pacific daylight saving time year-round, as clocks are not returned to UTC−08:00 in November when most jurisdictions return to Pacific Standard Time.

To accommodate this policy change, Microsoft created a new time zone called (UTC-07:00) Pacific Time (British Columbia).

In 2026, British Columbia adopted permanent time observation of UTC−07:00 following the switch to Pacific Daylight Time on March 8, thus no longer switching to Pacific Standard Time in November. This followed Yukon's abolition of daylight saving time in 2020, effectively aligning British Columbia's time with Yukon's. The government of British Columbia categorized the change as a move to a new time zone called Pacific Time, despite Yukon's previous adoption of the same time zone.

The regions in British Columbia that observed Mountain Time were not affected by the province's 2026 change. In August 2026, the Regional District of East Kootenay switched to year-round Central Standard Time (UTC−06:00), following Alberta's change earlier in 2026. Other areas like Creston, Kootenay Bay and northeastern British Columbia continued to observe permanent Mountain Standard Time year-round and thus are also effectively in sync with the province's Pacific Time.

The town of Golden and Columbia-Shuswap Regional District Area A originally elected to follow the province's move to year-round Mountain Standard Time (UTC−07:00), planning to switch to the time zone by moving one hour back on November 1, 2026. This was reversed in September 2026, when Golden and Columbia-Shuswap Area A switched to year-round Central Standard Time.

== History ==
In 2019, a public survey indicated 93% support for abolishing the time change, and a 54% preference for doing so in alignment with neighbouring jurisdictions. Later that year, British Columbia enacted the Interpretation Amendment Act, which enabled the province's areas in the Pacific Time Zone to permanently switch to seven hours behind Coordinated Universal Time (UTC−07:00) pending an official announcement. California voters passed Proposition 7 in 2018, authorizing the state to switch to a permanent time zone, either Pacific Standard Time or Pacific Daylight Time (PDT), although switching to permanent PDT would require the approval of the U.S. Congress. The Washington State Legislature passed a law in 2019 that would move the state to permanent daylight time, also subject to congressional approval. However, that approval under the Sunshine Protection Act had yet to be granted by 2026. Yukon adopted year-round UTC−07:00 in 2020; British Columbia's Pacific Time is thus identical to Yukon Time.

On March 2, 2026, British Columbia premier David Eby announced the shift to permanent UTC−07:00 before the western U.S. states, saying British Columbia should "stand on our own two feet as a province in relation to everything, including time zones".
