= Emergency Daylight Saving Time Energy Conservation Act =

1973 United States law temporarily making Daylight Saving Time permanent year-round

- Long title: An Act to provide for daylight saving time on a year-round basis for a two-year trial period, and to require the Federal Communications Commission to permit certain daytime broadcast stations to operate before local sunrise.
- Enacted by: the 93rd United States Congress

Citations
- Public law: Pub. L. 93–182

Legislative history
- Introduced in the House of Representatives as H.R. 11324 by Harley Orrin Staggers (D–WV) on November 7, 1973; Committee consideration by House — Interstate and Foreign Commerce; Passed the House of Representatives on November 27, 1973 (Roll call); Passed the Senate on December 4, 1973 (Roll call); Signed into law by President Richard Nixon on December 15, 1973

The Emergency Daylight Saving Time Energy Conservation Act (Pub. L. 93–182, enacted December 15, 1973) is a law that made daylight saving time effective year-round for a trial period. It was intended to decrease energy use during the 1973 oil crisis.

This trial period began on January 6, 1974, and was intended to end on April 7, 1975. Lawmakers ended the experiment early on October 27, 1974, and did not make the change permanent due to concerns about darkness on winter mornings. Under the previous Uniform Time Act, DST began on the last Sunday of April and ended on the last Sunday of October.

== See also ==
- Permanent time observation in the United States
- Sunshine Protection Act
