= Permanent time observation in the United States =

Year-round standard time in the US

Changes clocks semiannually Observes permanent standard time

Establishing either permanent standard or daylight saving time (DST) eliminates the practice of semi-annual clock changes, specifically adjusting clocks forward by one hour from standard time to DST on the second Sunday in March (commonly called "spring forward") and back by one hour from DST to standard time on the first Sunday in November ("fall back"). The existing practice of switching the clocks twice a year is unpopular, with only about 20% of Americans preferring it.

The Uniform Time Act of 1966 formalized the specification of time zones and the dates of DST observation in the United States. Prior to this law, time zones and DST observation in America were independent and erratic across states and cities. The law requires states to change clocks semiannually between standard time and DST on federally mandated dates, and it permits states to opt out of DST observation altogether and remain on permanent standard time, but does not permit observation of permanent DST. Arizona (with the exception of the Navajo Nation), Hawaii, and all permanently inhabited territories observe permanent standard time.

Studies have shown the semiannual clock changes result in acute sleep disturbances, and the observation of DST results in chronic sleep deprivation, ultimately resulting in more health problems and traffic accidents. Legislators in more than two dozen states have attempted to switch to either permanent standard time or permanent DST.

== Effects of permanent time ==
Permanent standard time is considered by circadian health researchers and safety experts worldwide to be the best option for health, safety, schools, and economy, including the American Academy of Sleep Medicine, National Sleep Foundation, American College of Chest Physicians, National Safety Council, American College of Occupational and Environmental Medicine, Canadian Sleep Society, World Sleep Society, Society for Research on Biological Rhythms, and several state sleep societies.

In 2025, a Stanford study compared the year-long circadian health impact of permanent standard time, permanent DST, and semiannually switching in the continental U.S. using models of the human circadian rhythm and health data from the CDC Places dataset. Researchers found that switching to permanent Standard Time was predicted to reduce cases of obesity by 2.6 million cases and stroke by 300,000 cases. Permanent DST also reduced cases but to a lesser extent. In interviews, the authors caution that this work is from a circadian health perspective and that other factors should be considered in policy decisions such as economic and safety impacts of time policy.

A meta-analysis by Rutgers researchers found that permanent DST could eliminate 171 pedestrian fatalities (a 13% reduction) per year. DST has been supported by the Chamber of Commerce since 1915 attributing added sales and outdoor activity to sunlight in the evenings. Additionally, DST has been expanded to nearly 8 months of the year, meaning standard time only gets to be observed for 4 months.

Some have warned, however, that the decreased exposure to morning sunlight will have significant detrimental effects. Sleep researchers have likened the resulting increased fatigue to "permanent [jet lag]". Experts such as Till Roenneberg argue that permanent observation of DST significantly increases rates of disease and accidents, and lowers productivity and wages. In 2018, the European Sleep Research Society, the European Biological Rhythms Society, and the Society for Research on Biological Rhythms (SRBR) released a joint statement to the EU Commission on DST in opposition to permanent DST and in support of permanent standard time. The SRBR followed with its own more comprehensive statement and set of materials supporting the same position in 2019. In August 2020, the American Academy of Sleep Medicine provided a statement on why they oppose permanent DST and favor permanent standard time.

Permanent standard time is supported by advocates for school children, including the National PTA, National Education Association, American Federation of Teachers, National School Boards Association, and Start School Later. They cite both the health benefits of circadian alignment, and the safety advantages regarding morning commutes.

Permanent standard time is also supported by environmental data, owing to evidence that DST observation increases morning heating, evening driving, and evening residential air conditioning, which all in turn increase energy consumption and pollution.

Permanent DST is also opposed by certain religious communities, such as certain Christian groups, Orthodox Jews, and Muslims, whose daily prayers and other customs may synchronize with times of sunrise and sunset.

Poor sleep among workers costs the United States $411 billion annually, according to Rand Europe. This figure, which equates to about 1.23 million workdays lost due to insufficient sleep each year, ranks the United States first in terms of economic losses due to insufficient sleep.

== Legal history of permanent time ==
Prior to the nationwide implementation of DST in 1967, most American states observed permanent standard time. Currently in the US, Arizona (with the exception of the Navajo Nation), Hawaii, and all permanently inhabited territories (American Samoa, Guam, the Northern Mariana Islands, Puerto Rico, and the Virgin Islands) observe permanent standard time. A number of states have proposed bills to restore observation of permanent standard time, but few have gained ground as of yet.

Permanent DST in the US was briefly in force after president Richard Nixon signed the Emergency Daylight Saving Time Energy Conservation Act, in response to the 1973 oil crisis. The new permanent DST law was retracted within the year. Year-round DST was initially supported by 79% of the public, but that support had dropped to 42% after its first winter. Considerable opposition to observing DST during the winter had come from school groups, such as the National School Boards Association, which expressed concern over darkness during the morning school commute. When members of Congress introduced legislation to repeal the practice, they stated it jeopardized children's safety, citing the deaths of eight schoolchildren in Florida since DST had been enacted a few weeks prior.

A change in current federal law would be necessary to allow states to observe DST permanently all year. A number of states have pursued state bills, resolutions, and referendums to indicate intention to observe permanent DST if federal law would permit it. As a workaround to the Uniform Time Act's prohibition on permanent DST, a few of states have proposed a statutory move to their next time zone eastward followed by abolishment of clock changes. If approved by the Department of Transportation, such a move would effectively put these states on permanent DST without needing to await amendment to the Uniform Time Act by Congress.

=== Federal legislation for permanent time ===
In 2019, Florida Republican Senator Marco Rubio and Florida Republican Representative Vern Buchanan introduced to Congress the "Sunshine Protection Act". The legislation would require all states to observe permanent DST, except those that self-exempt before its enactment (it would also remove the option to self-exempt after its enactment). The legislation was referred to committee but not heard.

Rubio and Buchanan renewed the legislation in 2021, and in 2022 Rubio's bill passed the Senate by voice consent. It did not pass the House, and both versions expired that December. Rubio and Buchanan renewed again in 2023. In 2025, and Florida Republican Senator Rick Scott renewed it with Representative Buchanan. President Donald Trump lobbied in favor of the bill in June 2026, and the House passed Buchanan's bill the following month.

The American Academy of Sleep Medicine has opposed the Sunshine Protection Act and called instead for permanent standard time, a position supported by the American College of Chest Physicians and the World Sleep Society, among others.

=== State legislation for permanent time ===
A map of states that have enacted permanent daylight saving time, pending federal legislation permitting it. Permanent DST Permanent DST if other states also adopt it Permanent DST for part of the state if neighboring states also adopt it Permanent standard time

In 2015, the Nevada Senate passed Nevada Assembly Joint Resolution 4, which urged Congress to enact legislation allowing individual states to establish daylight saving time as the standard time in their respective states throughout the calendar year. This would mean that Nevada is on the same time as Arizona all year, but would be an hour ahead of California in the winter. The United States Congress has not yet enacted any enabling legislation in this regard.

In 2018, the Florida Senate approved the Sunshine Protection Act which would put Florida on permanent daylight saving time year round, and Governor Rick Scott signed it March 23. Congress would need to amend the existing 1966 federal law to allow the change.

In 2018, voters in California approved a ballot measure to permit the state legislature to pursue legislation for permanent daylight saving time or standard time. However, California law still requires a vote of two-thirds of the state's legislature (and approval of Congress for permanent DST). Bills for permanent DST followed in 2019 and 2022, which both failed.

In 2019, the Washington State Legislature passed Substitute House Bill 1196, which would establish year-round observation of daylight saving time contingent on the United States Congress amending federal law to authorize states to observe daylight saving time year-round. Tennessee and Oregon also passed bills in 2019 for year-round DST.

In 2021, the Georgia General Assembly passed Senate Bill 100 providing for year-round DST if the United States Congress amends 15 U.S.C. Section 260a to authorize states to observe daylight saving time year round.

In the 2025–2026 legislative cycle, legislation favoring permanent standard time was passed by single chambers in California, Kansas, North Dakota, Nebraska, Nevada, Oregon, and Utah; however none have yet been agreed by both chambers in these states.

State	Legislation for permanent standard time	Legislation for permanent DST	Notes
Alabama	No attempt	Success	
Alaska	Failure	Failure	
American Samoa	Success	No attempt	
Arizona	Success	No attempt	Has observed permanent standard time since 1968; see also Time in Arizona. (A.R.S. § 1-242, in effect since January 1, 1969)
Arkansas	Failure	Failure	One bill for permanent standard time, two for permanent DST.
California	Pending	Failure	In 2018, Proposition 7 passed, allowing the state legislature to change the periods of DST through another bill. Subsequent bills for permanent DST failed in 2020 and 2022. In 2023, a bill was proposed that would establish permanent standard time.
Colorado	Failure	Partial success	The change takes effect only if a federal law is enacted to allow states to remain on daylight saving time year round and at least 4 states in the MST zone, in addition to Colorado, enact legislation making daylight saving time the state's standard time throughout the year.
Connecticut	Failure	Failure	
Delaware	No attempt	Partial success	Establishes permanent Atlantic Standard Time. Requires Pennsylvania, New Jersey and Maryland to do the same.
District of Columbia	No attempt	No attempt	
Florida	No attempt	Success	
Georgia	Failure	Success (OCGA § 50-1-10)	Two simultaneous bills were introduced in 2021. One for permanent standard time, the other for permanent DST.
Guam	Success	No attempt	
Hawaii	Success	No attempt	Has observed permanent standard time since 1967; see also Time in Hawaii. (H.R.S. §1-31, in effect since March 30, 1967)
Idaho	Failure	Partial success	If Washington implements permanent daylight saving time, the northern part of the state in Pacific Time will follow. A bill to do the same for the part of the state in Mountain Time if Utah implements permanent daylight saving time has not passed.
Illinois	Failure	Pending	
Indiana	No attempt	No attempt	
Iowa	Failure	Failure	
Kansas	Pending	Failure	
Kentucky	No attempt	Failure	
Louisiana	No attempt	Success	
Maine	Pending	Partial success	Requires all states in the eastern time zone, and the District of Columbia, to do the same.
Maryland	No attempt	Failure	
Massachusetts	Pending	Pending	Establishes Atlantic Standard Time AST (UTC−04:00) in substitute for permanent DST or permanent standard time. This would be the same time as a permanent Eastern Daylight time EDT (UTC−04:00) (currently observed only in summer).
Michigan	No attempt	Pending	Requires Wisconsin, Illinois, Indiana, Ohio, and Pennsylvania to observe daylight saving time year-round.
Minnesota	Pending	Success	
Mississippi	Failure	Success	
Missouri	Failure	Failure	
Montana	Failure	Partial success	Requires at least three of the states of Idaho, North Dakota, South Dakota, Utah, and Wyoming to go on permanent DST.
Nebraska	Failure	Failure	
Nevada	Failure	No attempt	
New Hampshire	No attempt	Failure	
New Jersey	No attempt	Pending	
New Mexico	Failure	Failure	
New York	Pending	Pending	Bills for permanent DST, Atlantic Time, or permanent standard time.
North Carolina	No attempt	Pending	
North Dakota	Failure	No attempt	
Northern Mariana Islands	Success	No attempt	
Ohio	Failure	Pending	
Oklahoma	Failure	Success	
Oregon	Failure (2024)	Partial success	Requires participation of California and Washington. Bill for permanent standard time failed in early 2024.
Pennsylvania	Pending	Pending	
Puerto Rico	Success	No attempt	
Rhode Island	No attempt	No attempt	
South Carolina	No attempt	Success	
South Dakota	No attempt	No attempt	
Tennessee	Pending	Success	
Texas	Failure	Success	
U.S. Virgin Islands	Success	No attempt	
Utah	Failure	Partial success	Requires at least four of Arizona, California, Colorado, Idaho, Montana, Nevada, New Mexico, Oregon, Washington, and Wyoming to adopt permanent DST.
Vermont	Pending	Pending	
Virginia	Failure	Failure	
Washington	Pending	Success	A bill is planned for early 2025 that includes legislation for permanent standard time.
West Virginia	Failure	Failure	
Wisconsin	No attempt	No attempt	
Wyoming	Failure	Partial success	Requires three or more of Colorado, Idaho, Montana, Nebraska, North Dakota, South Dakota, and Utah to adopt permanent DST.

== See also ==
- Daylight saving time by country
- Daylight saving time in the United States
- List of time offsets by U.S. state and territory
- Standard Time Act
- Universal Time
- Winter time (clock lag)
