= Time in Hawaii =

Hawaii is in the Hawaii–Aleutian Time Zone (HST; UTC−10:00) and does not observe daylight saving time.

== History ==
Before 1896, Hawaii did not use a standard time zone. On January 8, 1896, the minister of the interior of the Provisional Government of Hawaii created a standard time zone, Hawaiian Standard Time, which was set at UTC−10:30. Hawaii began observing Hawaiian Standard Time on January 13, 1896, at noon. On May 19, 1947, the Hawaii Territorial Legislature approved a bill to change Hawaiian Standard Time to UTC−10:00(which is about half an hour ahead of mean solar time in Hawaii), which would go into effect on June 8, 1947.

After the Uniform Time Act was passed in 1966, Hawaii was placed in the new Alaska–Hawaii Time Zone. On March 30, 1967, the Hawaii State Legislature chose to exempt the state from using daylight saving time. The zone received its current name, "Hawaii–Aleutian Time Zone", in 1984.

The Midway Islands, though geographically part of the Hawaiian islands, uses UTC–11:00 since they are organized as part of the United States Minor Outlying Islands and not the state of Hawaii,. Uninhabited Kure Atoll, which is part of the state, uses Hawaii–Aleutian Time despite being even further west.

== IANA time zone database ==
The zone for Hawaii as given by zone.tab of the IANA time zone database. Columns marked * are from the zone.tab.

c.c.*	coordinates*	TZ*	comments*	UTC offset	UTC offset DST	Note
US	+211825−1575130	Pacific/Honolulu	Hawaii	−10:00	−10:00	

== See also ==
- Time in the United States
