= History of time in the United States =

Different time zones in the history of the United States

The evolution of United States standard time zone boundaries from 1919 to 2024 in five-year increments.

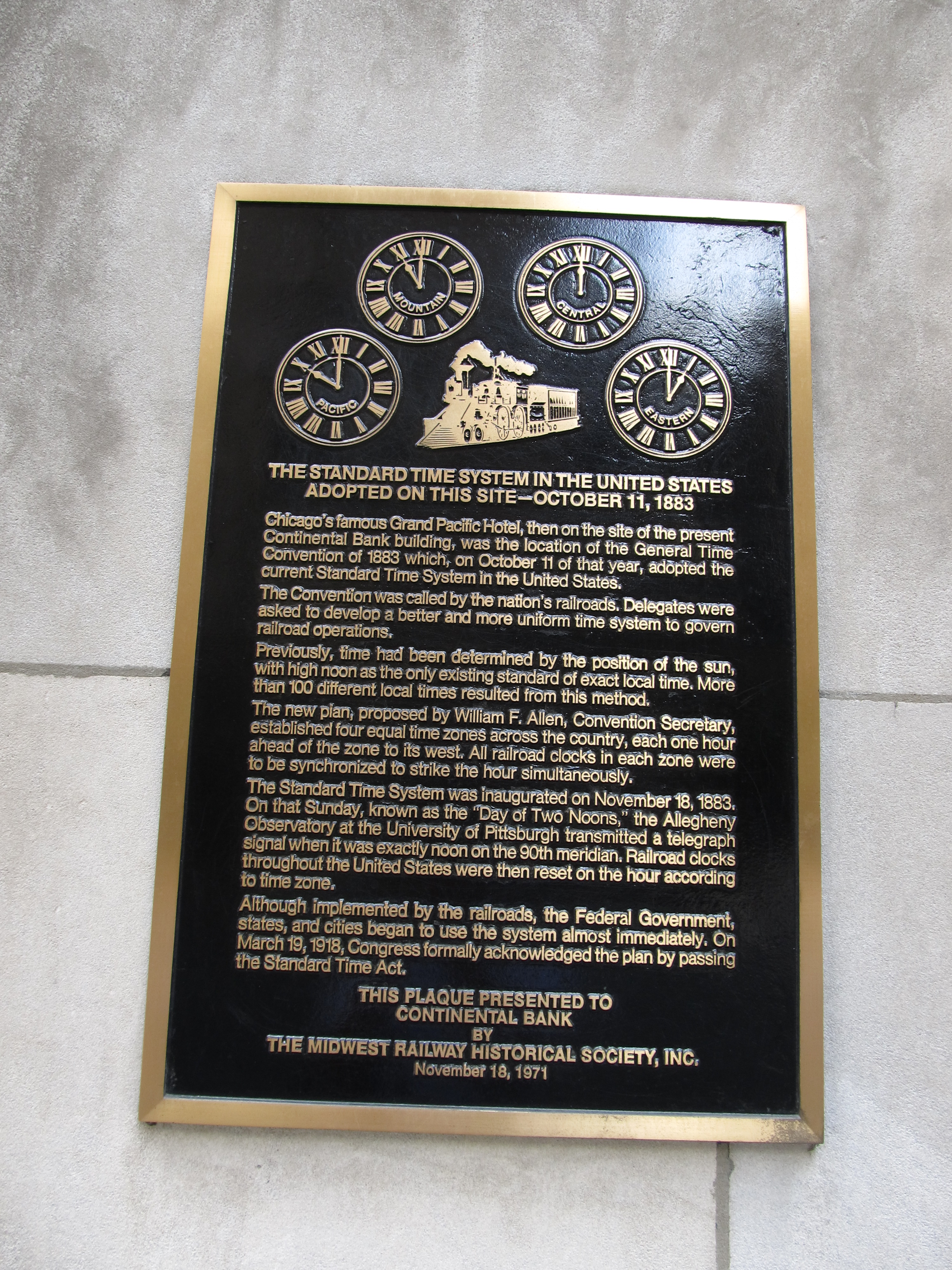
Plaque in Chicago marking the creation of the four time zones of the contiguous United States in 1883

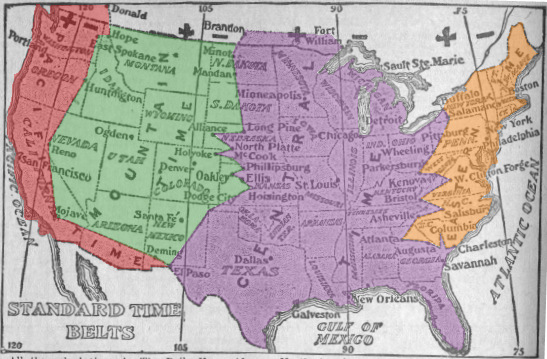
Colorized 1913 time zone map of the United States, showing boundaries very different from today

Map of U.S. time zones during between April 2, 2006, and March 11, 2007. The current situation is different only in that six Indiana counties have since been moved from the Central time zone to the Eastern time zone, and one county in North Dakota has since been moved from the Mountain time zone to the Central time zone.

On November 18, 1883, United States and Canadian railroads instituted standard time in time zones. Before then, time of day was a local matter, and most cities and towns used some form of local solar time, maintained by some well-known clock (for example, on a church steeple or in a jeweler's window). The standard time system was not immediately embraced by all. Standard time in time zones was established in U.S. law in the Standard Time Act on March 19, 1918, at which time daylight saving time was also instituted.

Use of standard time gradually increased because of its obvious practical advantages for communication and travel. Standard time in time zones was established in U.S. law in the Standard Time Act on March 19, 1918. The act established daylight saving time, which was and is a contentious idea. Daylight saving time was repealed in 1919, but standard time in time zones remained in law, with the Interstate Commerce Commission (ICC) having the authority over time zone boundaries. Daylight time became a local matter; ultimately, it was reinstated nationally early in World War II and was continuously observed until the end of the war. After the war its use varied among states and localities. The Uniform Time Act of 1966 provided standardization in the dates of beginning and end of daylight time in the U.S. but allowed for local exemptions from its observance.

Time zone boundaries have changed greatly since their original introduction, and changes still occasionally occur. The United States Department of Transportation (DOT) issues press releases when these changes are made. Generally, time zone boundaries have tended to shift westward. Places on the eastern edge of a time zone can effectively move sunset an hour later (by the clock) by shifting to the time zone immediately to their east. If they do so, the boundary of that zone is locally shifted to the west; the accumulation of such changes results in the long-term westward trend. The process is not inexorable, however, since the late sunrises experienced by such places during the winter may be regarded as too undesirable. Furthermore, under the law, the principal standard for deciding on a time zone change is the "convenience of commerce". Proposed time zone changes have been both approved and rejected based on this criterion, although most such proposals have been accepted.

== Railway time ==
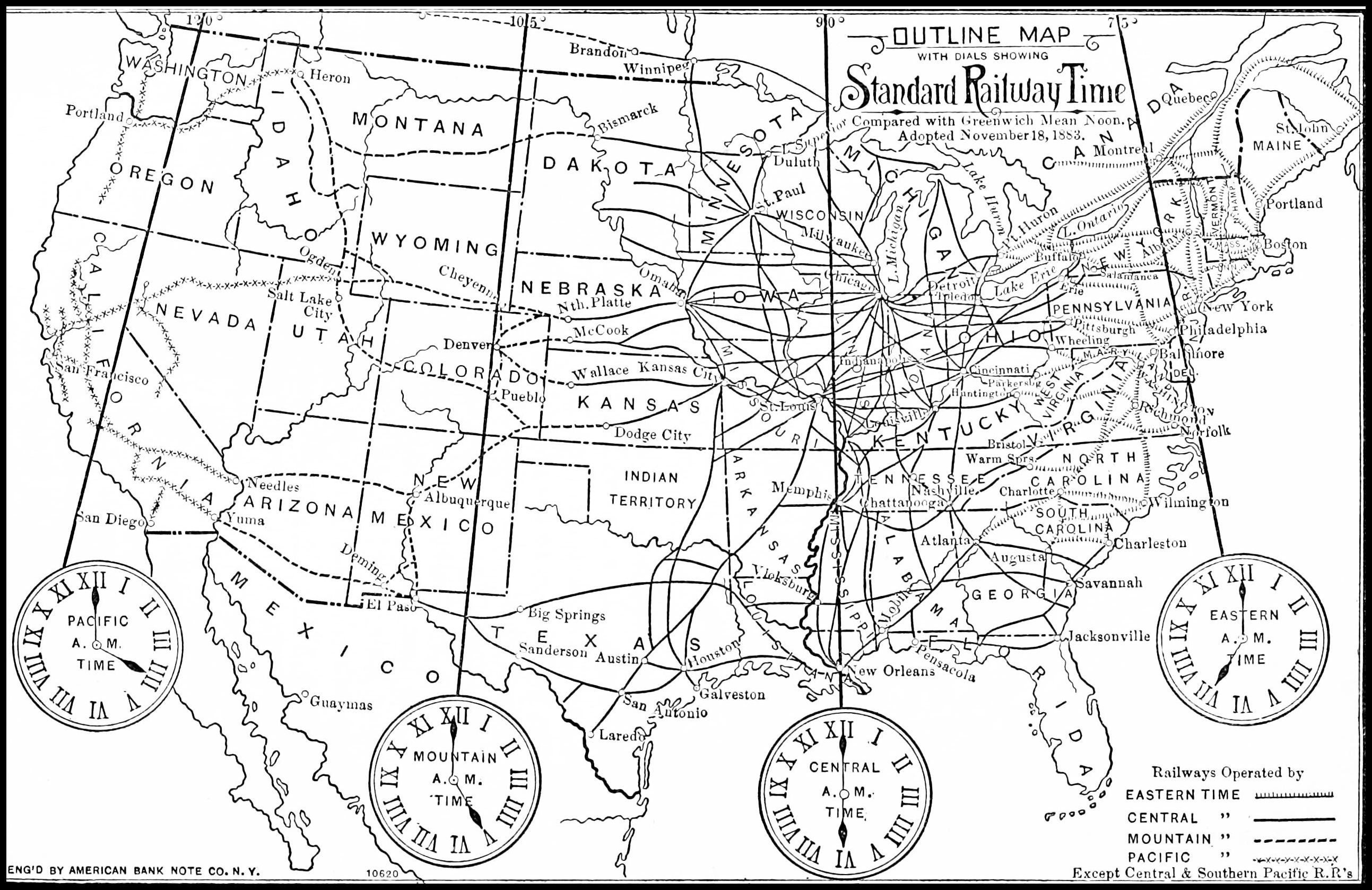
Map of 1884/5 explaining the time zones used on American railway lines.

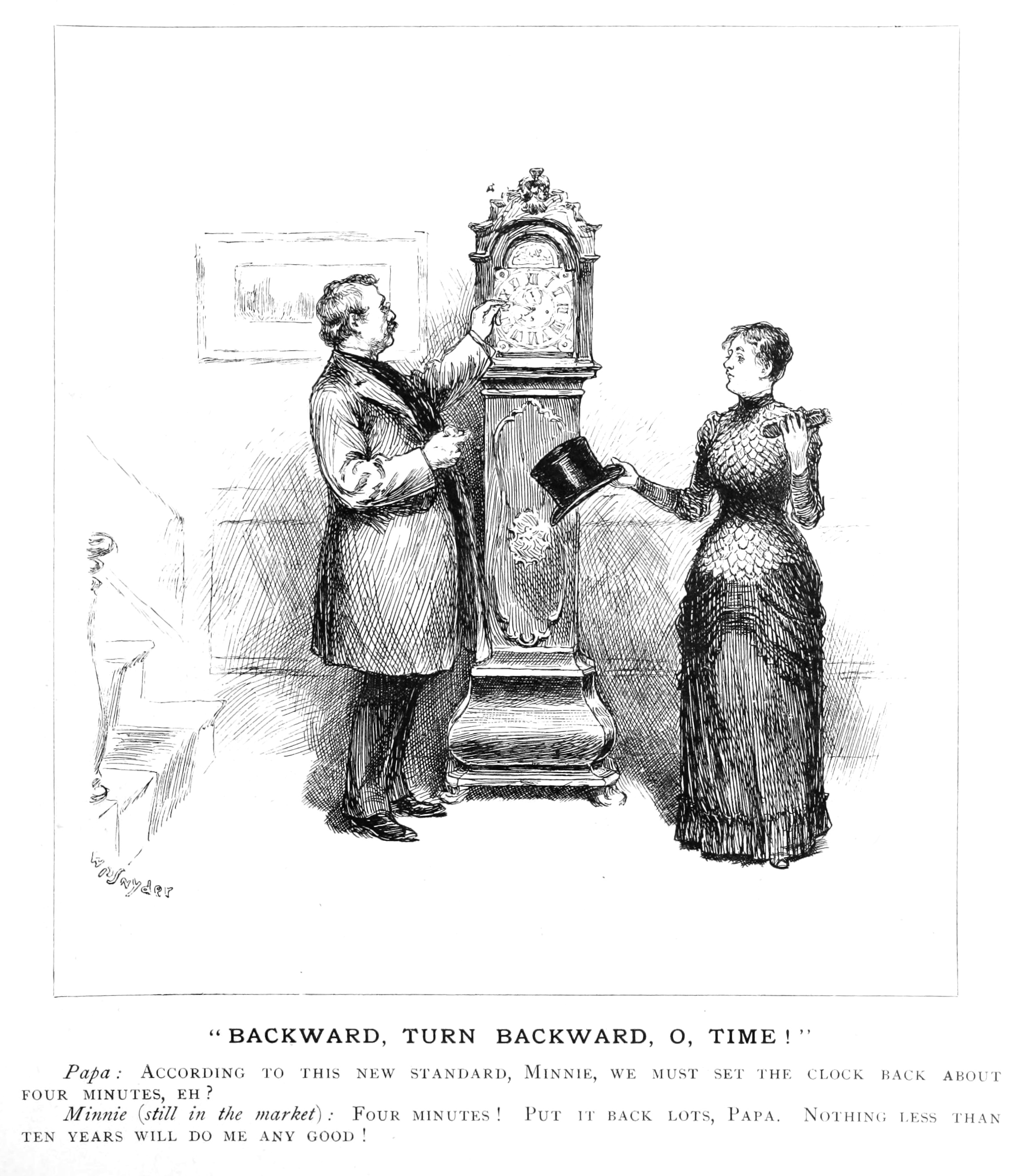
This cartoon appeared on the cover of Life magazine, January 3, 1884

One of the first reported incidents which brought about a change in how time was organized on railways in the United States occurred in New England in August 1853. Two trains heading towards each other on the same track collided in the Valley Falls train collision because the train conductors had different times set on their watches, resulting in the death of 14 passengers.

Railway schedules were coordinated in New England shortly after this incident. Numerous other collisions led to the setting up of the General Time Convention, a committee of railway companies to agree on scheduling.

In 1870 Charles F. Dowd, who was unconnected with the railway movement or civil authorities, proposed A System of National Times for Railroads, which involved a single time for railways but the keeping of local times for towns. Although this did not find favor with railway managers, in 1881 they agreed for the idea to be investigated by William Frederick Allen, who was the secretary of the General Time Convention and managing editor of the Travellers' Official Guide to the Railways. He proposed replacing the 50 railway times with five time zones. He eventually persuaded the railway managers and the politicians running the cities that had several railway stations that it was in their interests to speedily adopt his simpler proposals, which aligned the zones with cities' railroad stations. In doing so, they would pre-empt the imposition of more costly and cumbersome arrangements by state legislators and the naval authorities, both of whom favored retention of local times.

On 11 October 1883, a convention of railroad executives met in Chicago at the General Time Convention (later renamed the American Railway Association) and agreed to the implementation of five time zones in North America, using Greenwich Mean Time as a basis. Right to the end, many small towns and cities expressed opposition to the imposition of railway time. On November 17, 1883, the Indianapolis Sentinel lamented that "the sun is no longer to boss the job" and that "people must eat, sleep, and work by railroad time... people will have to marry by railroad time... ministers will be required to preach by railroad time".

Nonetheless, standard railway time was supported by nearly all rail companies, as well as by most cities and influential institutions such as Yale and Harvard, and was introduced at noon on November 18, 1883. This consensus held and was incorporated into federal law in 1918.

== Standard time and war time ==
Daylight saving time (DST) was established by the Standard Time Act of 1918. The act was intended to save electricity for seven months of the year, during World War I. DST was repealed in 1919 over a presidential veto, but standard time in time zones remained in law, with the Interstate Commerce Commission (ICC) having the authority over time zone boundaries. Daylight time became a local matter.

During World War II, Congress enacted the War Time Act (56 Stat. 9) on January 20, 1942. Year-round DST was reinstated in the United States on February 9, 1942, again as a wartime measure to conserve energy resources. This remained in effect until after the end of the war. After V-J Day, the word 'war' and the middle letter 'W' were changed to 'prevailing' and 'P', but the advance in the clock was not reverted. The Amendment to the War Time Act (59 Stat. 537) ended DST as of September 30, 1945. During this period, the official designation War Time was used for year-round DST. For example, Eastern War Time (EWT) would be the equivalent of Eastern Daylight Time during this period.

== Local-option daylight saving time ==
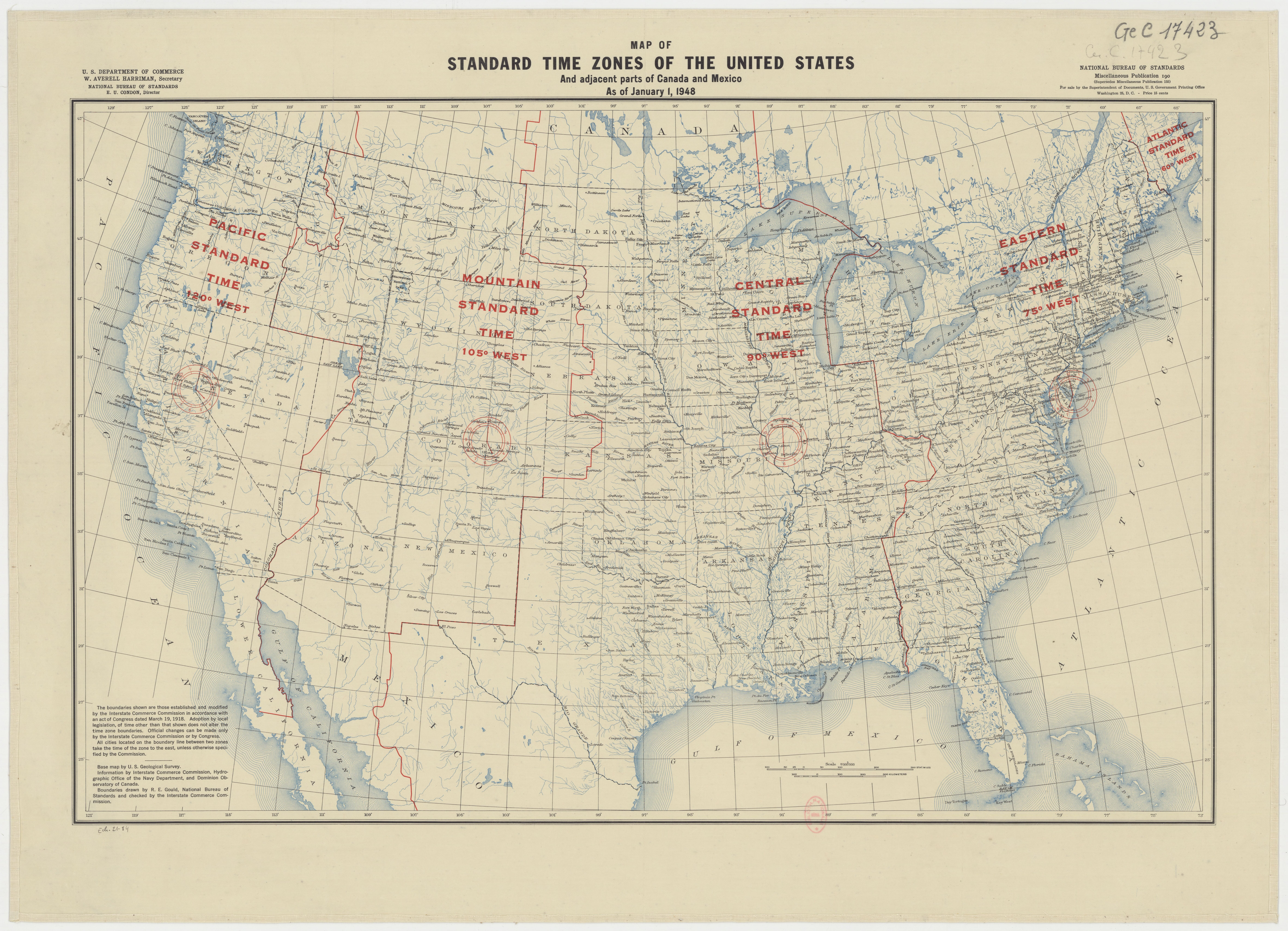
Time zone map of 1948. The borders between zones are slightly different to those of today.

From 1945 to 1966 U.S. federal law did not address DST. States and cities were free to observe DST or not, and most places that did observe DST did so from the last Sunday in April to the last Sunday in September. In the mid-1950s many areas in the northeastern United States began extending DST to the last Sunday in October. The lack of standardization led to a patchwork where some areas observed DST while adjacent areas did not, and it was not unheard of to have to reset a clock several times during a short trip (e.g., bus drivers operating on West Virginia Route 2 between Moundsville, West Virginia, and Steubenville, Ohio, had to reset their watches seven times over 35 miles).

== Uniform Time Act ==
In the mid-1960s the airline and other transportation industries lobbied for uniformity of DST dates in the United States. The federal Uniform Time Act became law on April 13, 1966, and it mandated that DST begin nationwide on the last Sunday in April and end on the last Sunday in October, effective in 1967. The act explicitly preempted all previously enacted state laws related to the beginning and ending of DST effective in 1966. Any state that wanted to be exempt from DST could do so by passing a state law, provided that it exempted the entire state, and Alaska, Arizona, Hawaii, Indiana, and Michigan chose to do so. However, Alaska, Indiana, and Michigan subsequently chose to observe DST.

The act also continued the authority of the ICC over time zone boundaries. In subsequent years, the United States Congress transferred the authority over time zones to the United States Department of Transportation (DOT).

The law was amended in 1972 to permit states that straddle a time zone boundary to exempt the entire area of the state lying in one time zone. Indiana chose to exempt the portion of the state lying in the Eastern Time Zone; however, that exemption was eliminated in 2006, and the entire state of Indiana observes DST, leaving Arizona (with the exception of the Navajo Nation) and Hawaii as the only two states not to observe DST.

In response to the 1973 oil crisis, DST began earlier in both 1974 and 1975, commencing on the first Sunday in January (January 6) in the former year and the last Sunday in February (February 23) in the latter. The extension was not continued due to public opposition to late sunrise times during the winter months. In 1976, the United States reverted to the schedule set in the Uniform Time Act.

== Daylight saving time extensions ==
On July 8, 1986, President Ronald Reagan signed the Federal Fire Prevention and Control Act of 1986 into law that contained a daylight saving rider authored by Senator Slade Gorton. The start date of DST was amended from the last Sunday of April to the first Sunday in April effective in 1987, extending DST three to four weeks; DST continued to end on the last Sunday in October. While the states retain the capability to exempt themselves from DST, they are forbidden by the 1966 federal law (15 USC 260a(b)) from increasing a state's time spent on DST, unless the United States Congress does this for the entire nation.

Starting March 11, 2007, DST was extended another four to five weeks, by moving both its start date to the second Sunday of March and its end date to the first Sunday of November. This time the change was introduced by Representatives Fred Upton and Ed Markey and added to the Energy Policy Act of 2005; the United States House of Representatives had originally approved a motion that would have extended DST even farther from the first Sunday in March to the last Sunday in November, but Senators Jeff Bingaman and Pete Domenici agreed to scale back the proposal in conference committee due to complaints from farmers and the airline industry. Proponents claimed that the extension would save "the equivalent of" 10,000 barrels (1,600 m^{3}) of oil per day, but this figure was based on outdated United States Department of Energy information from the 1970s; later studies by the U.S. Department of Energy and the California Energy Commission have predicted much smaller energy benefits. There is very little recent research on what the actual positive effects, if any, might be.

=== Controversy ===
Since DST moves sunrise one hour later by the clock, late sunrise times become a problem when DST is observed either too far before the March equinox or too far after the September equinox. Because of this, the extension was greeted with criticism by those concerned for the safety of children who would have been forced to travel to school before sunrise, especially in the month of March. In addition, the airline industry was especially concerned if DST were to be extended through to the last Sunday in November, as this is very often the Sunday after Thanksgiving (except for 2013, 2019, 2024, and 2030), as this is always the Sunday after the fourth Friday in November, and Thanksgiving is on the fourth Thursday in November. This is one of the busiest travel days at American airports, and could have resulted in much havoc among travelers who forgot that the clocks were changing that day.

If the original proposal to extend DST through the last Sunday in November had been adopted, the entire United States, with the exception of the states that exempted themselves, would have experienced the latest sunrises of the year during the month of November, which would have approached the extremely late sunrise times when DST went into effect on January 6, 1974, due to the 1973 oil crisis creeping after 9 a.m. in places like New Salem, North Dakota at the northwestern edges of time zones.

Under the current rules, the latest sunrise occurs on the day before DST ends, everywhere in the United States that observes DST. This sunrise time is later than any during the winter months.

== Start and end dates of daylight saving time ==
Key to colors
future date
second Sunday March, first Sunday November
first Sunday April, last Sunday October
last Sunday April, last Sunday October

Year	DST begins (local)	DST ends (local)	Notes
2026	Sun March 8 02:00	Sun November 1 02:00	
2025	Sun March 9 02:00	Sun November 2 02:00	
2024	Sun March 10 02:00	Sun November 3 02:00	
2023	Sun March 12 02:00	Sun November 5 02:00	
2022	Sun March 13 02:00	Sun November 6 02:00	
2021	Sun March 14 02:00	Sun November 7 02:00	
2020	Sun March 8 02:00	Sun November 1 02:00	
2019	Sun March 10 02:00	Sun November 3 02:00	
2018	Sun March 11 02:00	Sun November 4 02:00	
2017	Sun March 12 02:00	Sun November 5 02:00	
2016	Sun March 13 02:00	Sun November 6 02:00	
2015	Sun March 8 02:00	Sun November 1 02:00	
2014	Sun March 9 02:00	Sun November 2 02:00	
2013	Sun March 10 02:00	Sun November 3 02:00	
2012	Sun March 11 02:00	Sun November 4 02:00	
2011	Sun March 13 02:00	Sun November 6 02:00	
2010	Sun March 14 02:00	Sun November 7 02:00	
2009	Sun March 8 02:00	Sun November 1 02:00	
2008	Sun March 9 02:00	Sun November 2 02:00	
2007	Sun March 11 02:00	Sun November 4 02:00	Energy Policy Act of 2005
2006	Sun April 2 02:00	Sun October 29 02:00	All of Indiana adopts DST
2005	Sun April 3 02:00	Sun October 30 02:00	
2004	Sun April 4 02:00	Sun October 31 02:00	
2003	Sun April 6 02:00	Sun October 26 02:00	
2002	Sun April 7 02:00	Sun October 27 02:00	
2001	Sun April 1 02:00	Sun October 28 02:00	
2000	Sun April 2 02:00	Sun October 29 02:00	
1999	Sun April 4 02:00	Sun October 31 02:00	
1998	Sun April 5 02:00	Sun October 25 02:00	
1997	Sun April 6 02:00	Sun October 26 02:00	
1996	Sun April 7 02:00	Sun October 27 02:00	
1995	Sun April 2 02:00	Sun October 29 02:00	
1994	Sun April 3 02:00	Sun October 30 02:00	
1993	Sun April 4 02:00	Sun October 31 02:00	
1992	Sun April 5 02:00	Sun October 25 02:00	
1991	Sun April 7 02:00	Sun October 27 02:00	
1990	Sun April 1 02:00	Sun October 28 02:00	
1989	Sun April 2 02:00	Sun October 29 02:00	
1988	Sun April 3 02:00	Sun October 30 02:00	
1987	Sun April 5 02:00	Sun October 25 02:00	Federal Fire Prevention and Control Act of 1986
1986	Sun April 27 02:00	Sun October 26 02:00	
1985	Sun April 28 02:00	Sun October 27 02:00	
1984	Sun April 29 02:00	Sun October 28 02:00	
1983	Sun April 24 02:00	Sun October 30 02:00	Alaska time zones changed Sun October 30 02:00
1982	Sun April 25 02:00	Sun October 31 02:00	
1981	Sun April 26 02:00	Sun October 25 02:00	
1980	Sun April 27 02:00	Sun October 26 02:00	
1979	Sun April 29 02:00	Sun October 28 02:00	
1978	Sun April 30 02:00	Sun October 29 02:00	
1977	Sun April 24 02:00	Sun October 30 02:00	
1976	Sun April 25 02:00	Sun October 31 02:00	
1975	Sun February 23 02:00	Sun October 26 02:00	Emergency Daylight Time Act; Michigan exempted, began DST Sun April 27 02:00
1974	Sun January 6 02:00	Sun October 27 02:00	Emergency Daylight Time Act; Southern Idaho and eastern Oregon (Mountain Time Zone) began DST Sun February 3 02:00
1973	Sun April 29 02:00	Sun October 28 02:00	All of Michigan adopts DST
1972	Sun April 30 02:00	Sun October 29 02:00	
1971	Sun April 25 02:00	Sun October 31 02:00	Indiana (Eastern Time Zone) opts out
1970	Sun April 26 02:00	Sun October 25 02:00	
1969	Sun April 27 02:00	Sun October 26 02:00	All of Alaska and Indiana on DST
1968	Sun April 28 02:00	Sun October 27 02:00	Arizona and Michigan opt out
1967	Sun April 30 02:00	Sun October 29 02:00	Alaska, Hawaii, Indiana and territories opt out
1966	Sun April 24 02:00	Sun October 30 02:00	Uniform Time Act of 1966 required states that used DST in 1966 to conform to last Sunday in April to last Sunday in October
1946–65			Local decision, various dates
1945		Sun September 30 02:00	War Time ends
1944			War Time all year Arizona War Time not observed Sat January 1 02:00–Sat April 1 02:00; Arizona War Time ends Sat September 30 02:00
1943			War Time all year
1942	Mon February 9 02:00		War Time begins year round War Time Act
1920–41			Local decision, various dates
1919	Sun March 30 02:00	Sun October 26 02:00	An Act For the repeal of the daylight-saving law enacted August 20, 1919
1918	Sun March 31 02:00	Sun October 27 02:00	Standard Time Act of 1918

== See also ==
- Daylight saving time in the United States – gives a list of future daylight saving dates
- Permanent time observation in the United States
- Time in Indiana
- Time in the United States
