= Sunshine Protection Act =

Proposed U.S. federal law to make daylight saving time permanent

Sunshine Protection Act of 2025
- Long title: An Act to make daylight saving time permanent, and for other purposes.
- Announced in: the 119th United States Congress

Codification
- Acts affected: Uniform Time Act

Legislative history
- Introduced in the House as H.R. 139 by Vern Buchanan (R–FL) on January 3, 2025; Passed the House on July 14, 2026 (308–117)

The Sunshine Protection Act is a proposed United States federal law that would make daylight saving time permanent, meaning the time would no longer change twice per year and would remain one hour ahead of standard time. The bill has been proposed during several sessions of Congress. In 2022, the Senate passed the bill by unanimous consent, although several senators stated later that they would have objected if they had known that the bill could pass. The United States House of Representatives did not take up the bill, and it expired at the end of the same year. In 2026, with the support of President Donald Trump, the House passed a reintroduced version of the bill, but the Senate has yet to approve it.

== Background ==
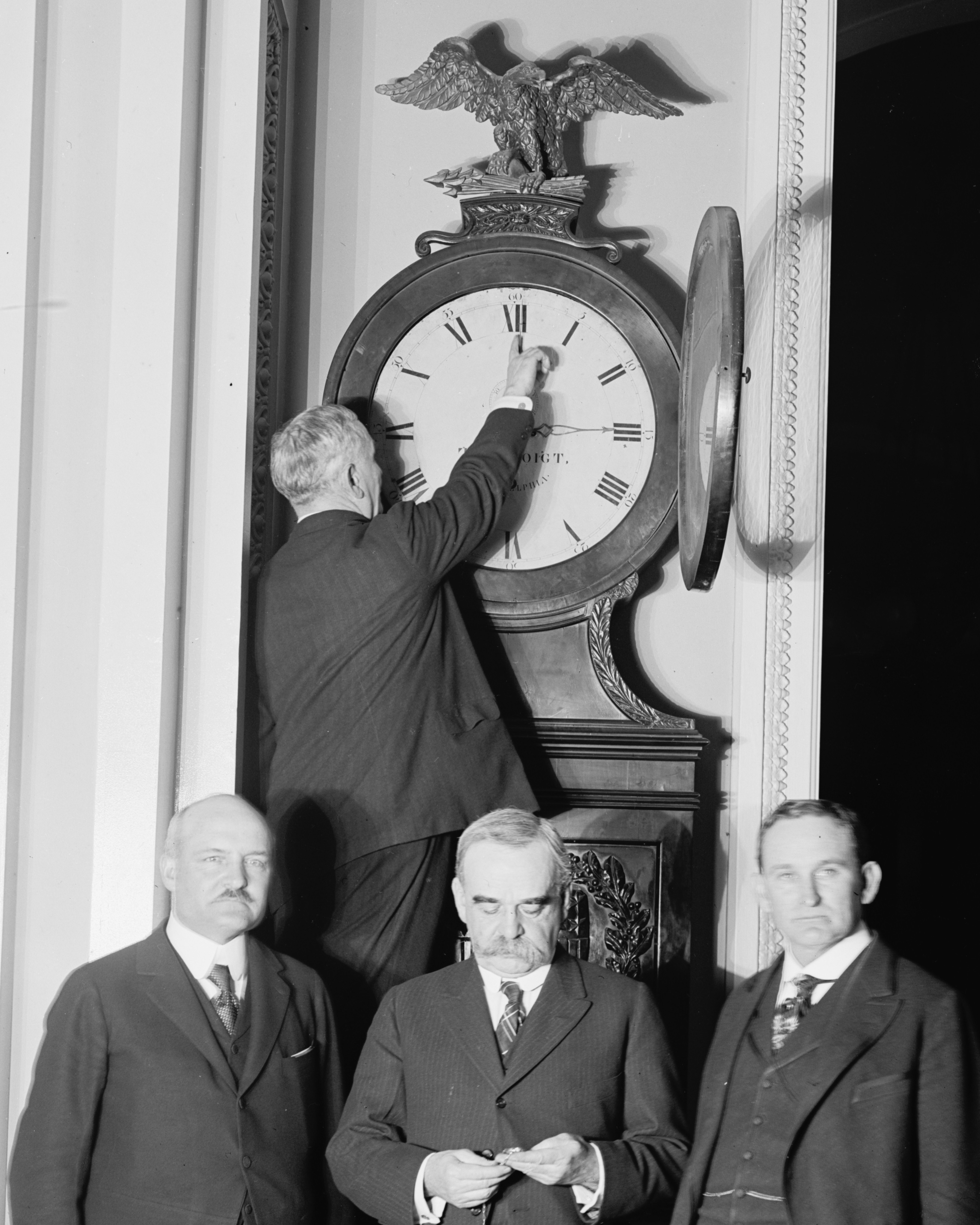
The Ohio Clock in the U.S. Capitol being turned forward for the first U.S. daylight saving time on March 31, 1918.

Time zones were introduced in the United States in 1883 by railroad companies. In 1918, they were codified into federal law by the Standard Time Act, which also included a provision for nationwide daylight saving time modeled after European laws designed to save energy during World War I, but that component was repealed a year later because farmers protested. Many states subsequently introduced daylight saving time, and in 1966, the Uniform Time Act standardized the dates when it begins and ends. Hawaii, Arizona (excluding the Navajo Nation), and the U.S. territories have opted to observe permanent standard time, but the Uniform Time Act "prohibits [individual states] from starting or stopping daylight saving on any dates other than the existing ones, which would also bar them from adopting it full-time."

Globally, many countries never used daylight saving time, or have abolished it already.

The Emergency Daylight Saving Time Energy Conservation Act enacted year-round daylight saving time for a year-and-a-half-long experiment from January 6, 1974, to April 7, 1975, but Congress later ended the experiment early on October 27, 1974, and did not make it permanent because of unfavorable public opinion, especially regarding concerns about children walking to school and waiting for school buses on dark winter mornings.

In the late 2010s, resolutions were passed in more than 30 states advocating for the federal government to abolish the annual transitions.

== Provisions ==
The Sunshine Protection Act would establish a permanent daylight saving time in the U.S., leading to later sunrises and sunsets during the four months in which most of the U.S. currently observes standard time, resulting in less sunlight in the morning hours and more sunlight in the evening ones. It would not mandate that states and territories that currently observe permanent standard time (American Samoa, most of Arizona, Guam, Hawaii, Northern Mariana Islands, Puerto Rico, and the Virgin Islands) switch to permanent daylight saving time, however it would repeal the section of law that currently provides for state-level self-exemption. Additional states would have the option to exempt themselves by adopting permanent standard time, if they opt out before the Sunshine Protection Act takes effect.

== Legislative history ==
The Sunshine Protection Act was first introduced in 2018 by U.S. senator Marco Rubio (R‑FL), modeled after a 2018 Florida bill of the same name. U.S. president Donald Trump tweeted that he would be willing to sign it, but it failed to advance. A reintroduction in 2019 by Vern Buchanan (R‑FL 16th) similarly failed.

The 2021 iteration was filed in the U.S. House of Representatives by Buchanan on January 4, 2021, and in the U.S. Senate by Rubio on March 9, 2021. The bill received bipartisan support, and was cosponsored in the Senate by James Lankford (R‑OK), Roy Blunt (R‑MO), Sheldon Whitehouse (D‑RI), Ron Wyden, (D‑OR); Cindy Hyde-Smith, (R‑MS), Rick Scott (R‑FL), and Ed Markey (D‑MA). It passed the Senate by unanimous consent on March 15, 2022. Two days later, BuzzFeed News reported that many senators were not aware that a request had been made for the bill to pass via unanimous consent and were not ready to raise an objection. Rubio's office had notified every other senator's office of the request; however, it is a frequent occurrence for legislative staff to "vet the request" themselves to "decide if an issue is too benign or obviously doomed to bother their boss with." BuzzFeed identified Tom Cotton (R‑AR) as a senator who, according to a member of his staff, was vehemently opposed to the bill and would have objected to its passage had he been informed of it. Upon being passed by the Senate, the bill faced uncertain prospects in the House. Ultimately, the 117th Congress ended without the House voting on the bill.

On July 14, 2026, the House passed a Sunshine Protection Act bill backed by President Trump. Nevertheless, the bill was opposed in the Senate by Republicans, including Senator Cotton. In response, on October 3, 2026, Trump shared a post on Truth Social urging Cotton to approve the bill, where he revealed Cotton's personal cellphone number and called on people to call him.

As of August 21, 2026, the full history is as follows:

Congress	Short title	Bill no.	Date introduced	Sponsors	No. of cosponsors	Status
115th Congress	Sunshine Protection Act of 2018	H.R. 5279	March 14, 2018	Vern Buchanan (R‑FL 16th)	3	Died in committee
115th Congress	Sunshine Protection Act of 2018	S. 2537	March 12, 2018	Marco Rubio (R‑FL)	0	Died in committee
116th Congress	Sunshine Protection Act of 2019	H.R. 1556	March 6, 2019	Vern Buchanan (R‑FL 16th)	23	Died in committee
116th Congress	Sunshine Protection Act of 2019	S. 670	March 6, 2019	Marco Rubio (R‑FL)	13	Died in committee
117th Congress	Sunshine Protection Act of 2021	H.R. 69	January 4, 2021	Vern Buchanan (R‑FL 16th)	48	Died in committee
117th Congress	Sunshine Protection Act of 2021	S. 623	March 9, 2021	Marco Rubio (R‑FL)	18	Passed Senate; died in House
118th Congress	Sunshine Protection Act of 2023	H.R. 1279	March 1, 2023	Vern Buchanan (R‑FL 16th)	38	Died in committee
118th Congress	Sunshine Protection Act of 2023	S. 582	March 1, 2023	Marco Rubio (R‑FL)	18	Died in committee
119th Congress	Sunshine Protection Act of 2025	H.R. 139	January 3, 2025	Vern Buchanan (R‑FL 16th)	34	Passed House; referred to the Senate Committee on Commerce, Science, and Transportation
119th Congress	Sunshine Protection Act of 2025	S. 29	January 7, 2025	Rick Scott (R‑FL)	18	Referred to the Senate Committee on Commerce, Science, and Transportation

== Debate ==
Numerous polls have found that most Americans believe that a time should be fixed and permanent—as many as 75% favor no longer changing clocks twice per year. One of the most common observations among researchers of varying backgrounds is that the change itself causes most of the negative effects, more so than either standard time or daylight saving time. Researchers have observed numerous ill effects of the annual transitions, including reduced worker productivity, increased myocardial infarctions and strokes, increased medical errors, and increased traffic incidents.

The debate over the bill mainly concerns whether it is better to have more sunlight in the morning or the evening. A 2023 YouGov poll found that 62% of Americans would prefer to stop switching clocks, and among them half supported permanent daylight time, 31% were in favor of permanent standard time, and 19% had no preference or were not sure.

Opponents of the Sunshine Protection Act argue permanent standard time would be more beneficial to health and human welfare. Numerous health specialists, safety experts, and research societies consider permanent standard time better for health, safety, schools, and the economy. However, the magnitude of effect in either direction is disputed. Furthermore, the majority of land within each American time zone is skewed westward, creating sunrises and sunsets that are both artificially late even without daylight saving time. (There are exceptions, such as New England). It is hypothesized closer harmony between standard time and biology contributes to safer morning commutes, improved student welfare, practicability of certain religious practices (such as in Orthodox Judaism and Islam), increased exposure to healthy morning sunlight, and higher productivity and wages.

However, advocates of permanent daylight saving time argue it has its own benefits including decreased crime, less frequent traffic incidents, longer evening outdoor recreation and decreased prevalence of seasonal depression.

Research is unclear about which time setting conserves more energy.

In 2025, a Stanford study compared the year-long circadian health impact of permanent standard time, permanent daylight saving time, and biannually switching in the continental U.S. using models of the human circadian rhythm and health data from the CDC Places dataset. Researchers found that switching to permanent standard time was predicted to reduce cases of obesity by 2.6 million cases and stroke by 300,000 cases. Permanent daylight saving time also reduced cases but to a lesser extent. In interviews, the authors caution that this work is from a circadian health perspective and that other factors should be considered in policy decisions such as economic and safety impacts of time policy.
