= UTC−10:30 =

Former time zone in Hawaii (1896–1947)

- Time zone

UTC offset
- UTC: UTC−10:30

Current time
- 21:14, 7 October 2026 UTC−10:30 [refresh]

UTC−10:30 is an identifier for a time offset from UTC of −10:30.

== History ==
Hawaii used a standard time of UTC−10:30 (which most neatly represented mean solar time) from 1896 until 1947, when the time zone was changed to UTC−10:00.

== See also ==
- Time in Hawaii
