= Ohio Clock =

Clock in the United States Capitol

Coordinates: 38.890353°N 77.008899°W

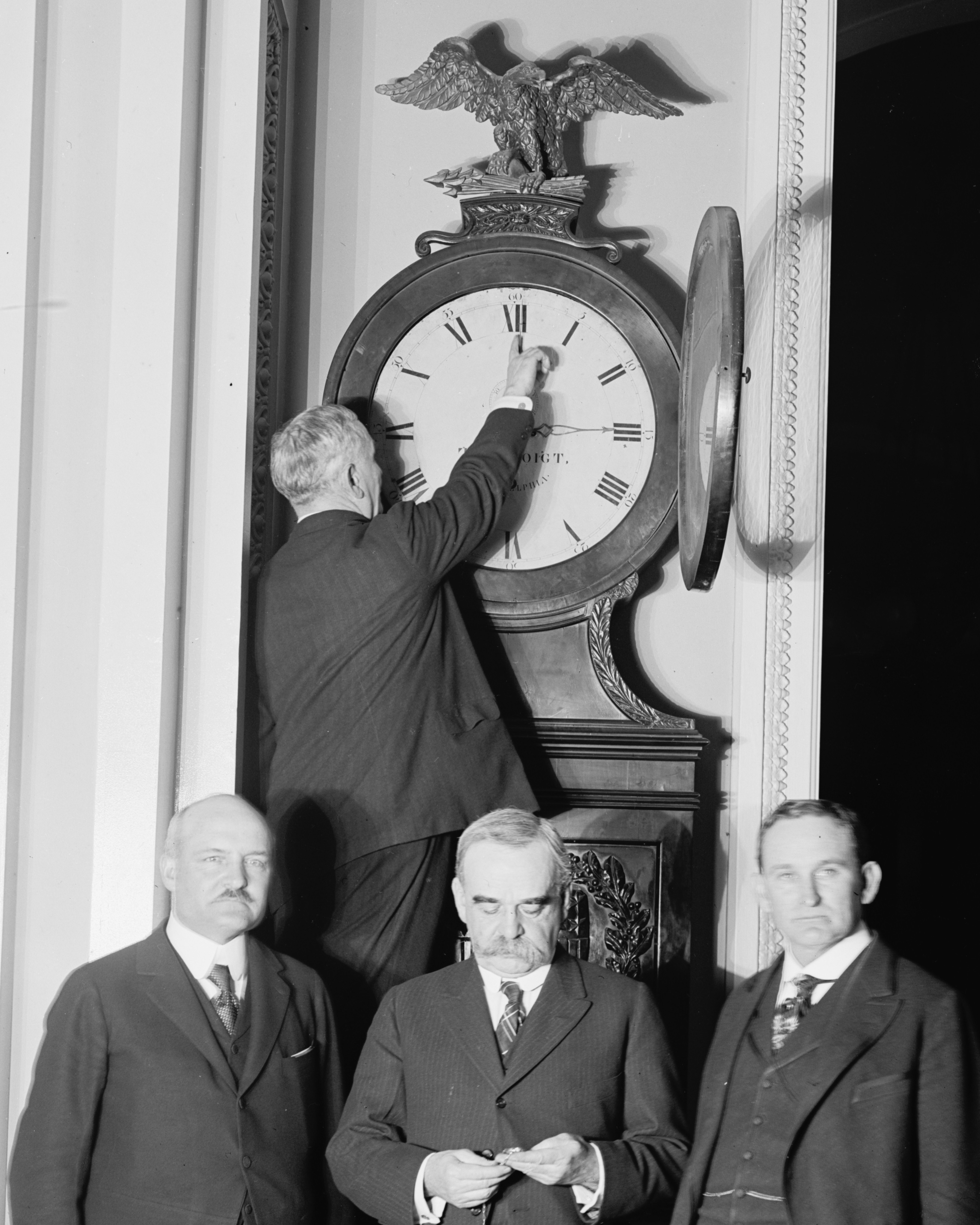
Senate Sergeant at Arms Charles P. Higgins turns forward the Ohio Clock for the first daylight saving time on March 31, 1918, while Senators William M. Calder, Willard Saulsbury, Jr., and Joseph T. Robinson look on.

The Ohio Clock (also known as the Senate Clock) is a clock in the United States Capitol. The United States Senate ordered the clock from Thomas Voigt in 1815, and it has stood in or near the Senate Chamber since 1859.

== History ==
Senator David Daggett of Connecticut ordered the 11 ft (3.4 m) tall clock in late December 1815 from Philadelphia clockmaker Thomas Voigt for use in the Old Brick Capitol. The clock was delivered in 1817 to the Old Senate Chamber and was moved to the corridor outside the newly finished Senate Chamber in 1859. There is no evidence to support the claim that senators hid illegal liquor in the clock during the Prohibition period. The glass covering the clock's face was broken in the 1983 United States Senate bombing. The clock, which was renovated in Boston in 2010, is wound weekly and keeps accurate time.

== Name ==
The source of the clock's name is unknown. One myth is that the clock was meant to commemorate Ohio's admission to the Union as the 17th state because the shield on the front of the clock's case has seventeen stars in it. However, there is no record that shows the clock celebrates Ohio's statehood and the clock was ordered twelve years after Ohio became a state, at a time when there were already eighteen states.

== Notes ==
This article incorporates public domain material from websites or documents of the United States Senate.
