= Hawaii–Aleutian Time Zone =

Time zone of North America

- Time zone
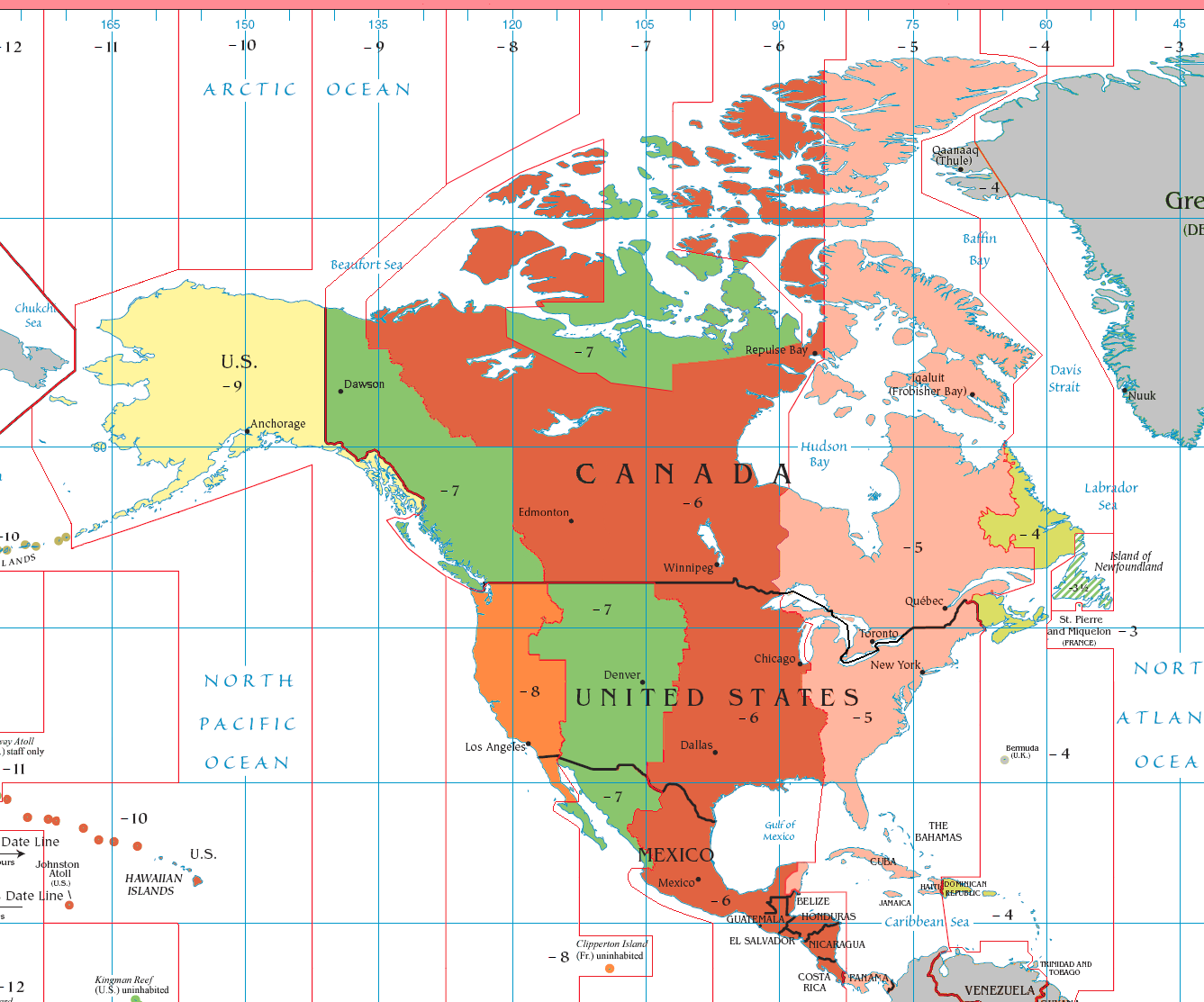

UTC offset
- HST: UTC−10:00
- HDT: UTC−09:00

Current time
- :: HST [refresh]

Observance of DST
- DST is observed in some of this time zone.

The Hawaii–Aleutian Time Zone observes Hawaii–Aleutian Standard Time (HST) by subtracting ten hours from Coordinated Universal Time (UTC−10:00). The clock time in this zone is based on the mean solar time of the 150th meridian west of the Greenwich Observatory.

The zone takes its name from the two areas it includes: Hawaii and the portion of Alaska's Aleutian Islands west of 169° 30′ W longitude.

== History ==
During daylight saving time (DST), the Alaskan portion observes Hawaii–Aleutian Daylight Time (HDT, UTC−09:00), while Hawaii stays on standard time. Hawaii has not observed daylight saving time since September 1945.

Until 1947, UTC−10:30 was used as standard time in Hawaii. On June 8 of that year, a new territorial law moved Hawaiian Standard Time 30 minutes ahead.

Hawaii–Aleutian Standard Time was established to maintain consistency in the scheduling of business and government activities across Hawaii and the Aleutian Islands.

== Usage ==
French Polynesia uses UTC−10:00 for its major cities. The Cook Islands also use the same time. These areas do not use DST. "Hawaii–Aleutian Time Zone" is a U.S. term and for that reason the Polynesian areas are not considered to be a part of the Hawaii–Aleutian Time Zone.

The largest city and metropolitan area in the Hawaii–Aleutian Time Zone are Honolulu and its metropolitan area, respectively.

== Major metropolitan areas ==
- Honolulu, Hawaii
- Hilo, Hawaii
- Kahului, Hawaii
- Kailua-Kona, Hawaii
- Kapaa, Hawaii

== Other significant places ==
- Adak Island, Alaska
- Atka, Alaska
- Johnston Atoll
- Palmyra Atoll

== See also ==
- Time zone
- Time offset
- Effects of time zones on North American broadcasting
