= 2018 California Proposition 7 =

Ballot measure permitting changes to daylight saving time

Proposition 7
- Conforms California Daylight Saving Time to federal law. Allows legislature to change Daylight Saving Time period.

Results
Choice	Votes	%
Yes	7,167,315	59.75%
No	4,828,564	40.25%
- County results Yes: 50–60% 60–70% No: 50–60%

Proposition 7 ("Prop 7") was a California ballot proposition in that state's general election on November 6, 2018. The measure allows for either ending daylight saving time or extending it year-round. It passed by a vote of about 60% Yes to 40% No.

The proposition permits the California State Legislature to change the times and dates of daylight saving time period by a two-thirds vote, all while in compliance with federal law. For the state to have such powers, Proposition 12 (1949), which established daylight saving time in California, needed to be repealed, which could only be done by the electorate.

Following passage of Proposition 7, California Assemblymember Kansen Chu submitted Assembly Bill 7 in 2019 to "eliminate the biannual clock change in California and set the state on daylight saving time year-round, pending federal authorization." The bill died in committee in 2020.

== Ballot Label summary ==
The California Secretary of State's summary from the Official Voter Information Guide of Proposition 7 is as follows:

"CONFORMS CALIFORNIA DAYLIGHT SAVING TIME TO FEDERAL LAW. ALLOWS LEGISLATURE TO CHANGE DAYLIGHT SAVING TIME PERIOD. LEGISLATIVE STATUTE. Gives Legislature ability to change daylight saving time period by two-thirds vote, if changes are consistent with federal law. Fiscal Impact: This measure has no direct fiscal effect because changes to daylight saving time would depend on future actions by the Legislature and potentially the federal government.

== Supporters ==
- Los Angeles Times
- San Diego Union-Tribune
- Ventura County Star

== Opponents ==
- Bakersfield Californian
- Marin Independent Journal
- San Francisco Chronicle
- The Mercury News
- Monterey Herald
- The Press-Democrat
- Sacramento Bee
- San Luis Obispo Tribune

== Election results ==
The results of the vote were 59.75% YES to 40.25% NO.

Proposition 7
Choice	Votes	%
For	7,167,315	59.75
Against	4,828,564	40.25
Total	11,995,879	100.00
Registered voters/turnout	19,696,371	–

== Aftermath ==
Despite passing with almost 60% of the vote, the proposition only allows the legislature to change the times and dates of daylight saving time period by a two-thirds vote of both chambers, while remaining in compliance with federal law. The Uniform Time Act permits permanent standard time, but not permanent daylight saving time.

In November 2019, Chu issued a news release promising to continue his efforts to urge passage of legislation in Washington, DC. "I share the disappointment with other Californians that we will be switching our clocks once again this November after passing Proposition 7... Unfortunately, the California State Senate Committee on Energy, Utilities and Communications did not bring AB 7 up for a vote so the bill died [in that committee in 2020]. While I will not be coming back as a State Assemblymember next year, I will continue my advocacy at the state and federal level to uphold Californians' will to get rid of our outdated practice of switching the clock back and forth twice a year. I urge everyone who voted for Prop 7 to reach out to your state and federal representatives and ask them to continue my effort in the upcoming legislative session."

In 2020, Democratic Assemblymember Lorena Gonzalez, who was a co-author of both Prop 7 and AB 7, expressed interest in a new bill. She has noted that medical consensus supports permanent standard time and opposes permanent daylight saving time, and that federal law makes permanent standard time the quicker path to ending clock change. But she has questioned whether a super majority of the legislature can agree.

In 2023, Republican Assemblymember Tri Ta authored a bill, AB 2697, to establish permanent standard time. The bill died in committee during the 2024 legislative session. The bill was never heard in the Assembly and failed to advance. Republican Senator Roger Niello introduced an identical bill in the Senate (SB 1413) which met the same fate.

== See also ==
- List of California ballot propositions 2010–19
- List of California ballot propositions
- 2018 California elections
- Elections in California
- Permanent time observation in the United States
