= Central Time Zone =

Time zone in North America

- Time zone
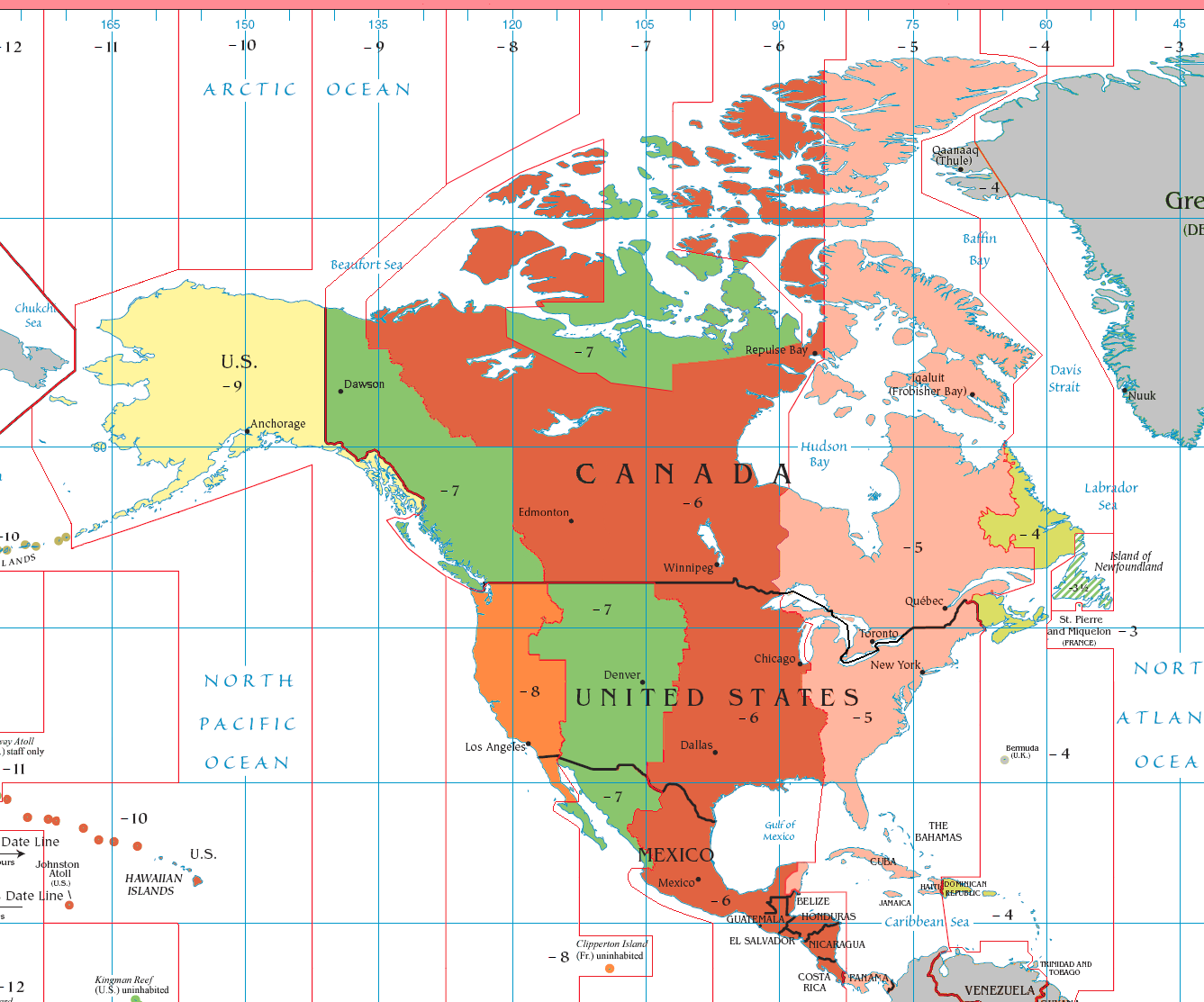
- Central Standard Time; Note that most of Mexico and Western Canada abolished DST

UTC offset
- CST: UTC−06:00
- CDT: UTC−05:00

Current time
- :: CST [refresh]

Observance of DST
- DST is observed in some of this time zone.

The Central Time Zone is a time zone in parts of Canada, the United States, Mexico, Central America, and a few Caribbean Islands. It is one hour behind the Eastern Time Zone.

Daylight saving time (DST) is observed in most parts of that zone (20 states in the US, one territory in Canada, and several border municipalities in Mexico): Central Standard Time (CST) is observed from the first Sunday in November to the second Sunday in March. It is six hours behind Coordinated Universal Time (UTC) and designated internationally as UTC−6. From the second Sunday in March to the first Sunday in November, the same areas observe DST, creating the designation of Central Daylight Time (CDT), which is five hours behind UTC and known formally as UTC−5.

== Regions using Central Time (CT) ==
=== Canada ===
Two provinces and one territory are contained entirely in the Central Time Zone, all on year-round Central Standard Time (UTC−6):

- Alberta
- Northwest Territories
- Saskatchewan

Central Standard Time (UTC−6 year-round) is officially called Alberta Time (ABT) and Northwest Territories Time in their respective jurisdictions.

In the province of British Columbia, Central Standard Time (UTC−6 year-round) is observed in the areas noted, while all other areas observe Mountain Standard Time:

- Regional District of East Kootenay
- Town of Golden
- Columbia-Shuswap Regional District Area A

The territory of Nunavut is split between Mountain, Central, and Eastern Time. The following regions observe Central Time:

- Western areas – most of Kivalliq Region and part of Qikiqtaaluk Region

On September 17, 2026, Manitoba premier Wab Kinew announced the province of Manitoba, previously on Central Time with daylight saving time, would be adopting permanent DST, moving the province to year-round Eastern Standard Time (UTC−05:00).

=== United States ===
Ten states are contained entirely in the Central Time Zone:

- Alabama
- Arkansas
- Illinois
- Iowa
- Louisiana
- Minnesota
- Mississippi
- Missouri
- Oklahoma
- Wisconsin

Five states are split between the Central Time Zone and the Mountain Time Zone:

- Kansas: all except for Sherman, Wallace, Greeley, and Hamilton counties
- Nebraska: eastern two thirds including the east part of Cherry County
- North Dakota: all except for southwest regions, south part of McKenzie County, and the majority of Dunn County and far western Sioux County
- South Dakota: eastern half including part of Stanley County
- Texas: all except for El Paso, Hudspeth, and northwestern Culberson counties

Five states are split between the Central Time Zone and the Eastern Time Zone:

- Florida: Florida panhandle west of the Apalachicola River; Franklin County west of the Apalachicola River and the northern parts of Gulf County are in the Central Time Zone
- Indiana: Northwest Indiana and most of Southwestern Indiana, including the Evansville metropolitan area
- Kentucky: the western portion of the state, including three major cities: Bowling Green, Owensboro and Paducah
- Michigan: The four Upper Peninsula counties bordering Wisconsin: Gogebic, Iron, Dickinson, and Menominee counties
- Tennessee: West Tennessee and Middle Tennessee, including the major cities of Nashville, Memphis, and Clarksville

Additionally, Phenix City, Alabama, and several nearby communities in Russell County, Alabama, unofficially observe Eastern Time. This is due to their close proximity to Columbus, Georgia, which is on Eastern Time.

Although legally located within the Central Time Zone, Kenton, Oklahoma—located to the adjacent east of the defined border of the Central and Mountain time zones (at the Oklahoma−New Mexico state line)—unofficially observes Mountain Time. This is reportedly because most people who interact with the town reside in either New Mexico or Colorado.

=== Mexico ===
Most of Mexico—roughly the eastern three-fourths—lies in the Central Time Zone, except for five northwestern states (Baja California, Baja California Sur, Sinaloa, Sonora, and most of Nayarit) and one southeastern state (Quintana Roo). It is known locally as the Zona Centro.

The federal entities of Mexico that observe Central Time:

- Aguascalientes
- Campeche
- Chihuahua – Excluding the municipalities of Janos, Ascensión, Juárez, Guadalupe, and Práxedis Gilberto Guerrero, which observe Mountain Time with DST. Additionally, counties east of Guadalupe observe Daylight Savings in Central Time.
- Coahuila
- Colima – except for the Revillagigedo Islands, in which the inner islands use UTC−7 and the outer island uses UTC−8
- Chiapas
- Durango
- Guanajuato
- Guerrero
- Hidalgo
- Jalisco
- Mexico City
- Michoacán
- Morelos
- Nayarit – *only the municipality of Bahía de Banderas, rest of the state uses UTC−7
- Nuevo León
- Oaxaca
- Puebla
- Querétaro
- San Luis Potosí
- State of Mexico
- Tabasco
- Tamaulipas
- Tlaxcala
- Veracruz
- Yucatán
- Zacatecas

=== Central America ===
Out of the seven countries comprising Central America, all but one use Central Standard Time year-round:

- Belize, Costa Rica, El Salvador, Guatemala, Honduras, and Nicaragua.

Panama, which recognizes Eastern Standard Time (UTC−5) year round, is the exception.

== Central Daylight Time ==
Daylight saving time (DST) is in effect in much of the Central time zone between mid-March and early November. The modified time is called "Central Daylight Time" (CDT) and is UTC−05:00.

In the United States, all time zones that observe DST were effectively changed by the Energy Policy Act of 2005. Beginning in 2007, DST would now begin at 2 am on the second Sunday in March instead of the first Sunday in April, moving the time from 2 to 3 am. Additionally, DST would end at 2 am on the first Sunday in November instead of the last Sunday in October, moving the time from 2 to 1 am.

At the time, Mexico decided not to go along with this change and observed their horario de verano ("summer schedule") from the first Sunday in April to the last Sunday in October. In December 2009, the Mexican Congress allowed ten border cities, eight of which are in states that observe Central Time, to adopt the US daylight time schedule effective in 2010. In October 2022, however, CDT was used in Mexico for the last time after DST was abolished. The US is seeing traction in the opposite direction, with the Sunshine Protection Act that proposes legislation that would make daylight saving time permanent.

== Alphabetical list of major Central Time Zone metropolitan areas ==
- Acapulco, Guerrero
- Aguascalientes, Aguascalientes
- Amarillo, Texas
- Antigua Guatemala
- Austin, Texas
- Baton Rouge, Louisiana
- Beaumont/Port Arthur, Texas
- Belize City, Belize
- Belmopan, Belize
- Birmingham, Alabama
- Bismarck, North Dakota
- Bloomington, Illinois
- Bowling Green, Kentucky
- Brownsville, Texas
- Calgary, Alberta
- Cedar Rapids, Iowa
- Champaign, Illinois
- Chicago, Illinois
- Clarksville, Tennessee
- Comarca Lagunera (Torreón, Gómez Palacio, Lerdo)
- Columbia, Missouri
- Cranbrook, British Columbia
- Cuernavaca, Morelos
- Dallas–Fort Worth, Texas
- Davenport, Iowa
- Des Moines, Iowa
- Edmonton, Alberta
- Enid, Oklahoma
- Evansville, Indiana
- Fargo, North Dakota
- Fort Smith, Arkansas
- Fort Walton Beach, Florida
- Grand Forks, North Dakota
- Green Bay, Wisconsin
- Guadalajara, Jalisco
- Guatemala City, Guatemala
- Houston, Texas
- Huntsville, Alabama
- Iowa City, Iowa
- Jackson, Mississippi
- Jackson, Tennessee
- Janesville, Wisconsin
- Jonesboro, Arkansas
- Joplin, Missouri
- Kansas City, Missouri/Kansas
- Killeen–Temple–Fort Hood, Texas
- Lafayette, Louisiana
- Lawrence, Kansas
- León, Guanajuato
- Lethbridge, Alberta
- Lincoln, Nebraska
- Little Rock, Arkansas
- Lubbock, Texas
- Madison, Wisconsin
- Managua, Nicaragua
- Memphis, Tennessee
- Mérida, Yucatán
- Mexico City
- Midland/Odessa, Texas
- Milwaukee, Wisconsin
- Minneapolis–Saint Paul, Minnesota
- Mobile, Alabama
- Monroe, Louisiana
- Monterrey, Nuevo León
- Montgomery, Alabama
- Morelia, Michoacán
- Nashville, Tennessee
- New Orleans, Louisiana
- Normal, Illinois
- Northwest Arkansas
- Oklahoma City, Oklahoma
- Omaha, Nebraska
- Owensboro, Kentucky
- Paducah, Kentucky
- Panama City, Florida
- Pensacola, Florida
- Peoria, Illinois
- Puebla, Puebla
- Quad Cities, Iowa/Illinois
- Racine, Wisconsin
- Red Deer, Alberta
- Regina, Saskatchewan
- Rockford, Illinois
- Rochester, Minnesota
- Sioux City, Iowa
- Sioux Falls, South Dakota
- St. Louis, Missouri
- San Antonio, Texas
- San José, Costa Rica
- San Luis Potosí, San Luis Potosí
- San Pedro Sula, Honduras
- San Salvador, El Salvador
- Santiago de Querétaro, Querétaro
- Saskatoon, Saskatchewan
- Shreveport–Bossier City, Louisiana
- Springfield, Illinois
- Springfield, Missouri
- Tampico, Tamaulipas
- Tegucigalpa, Honduras
- Toluca, Estado de México
- Topeka, Kansas
- Tuscaloosa, Alabama
- Tulsa, Oklahoma
- Wichita, Kansas
- Wichita Falls, Texas
- Yellowknife, Northwest Territories
- Zacatecas, Zacatecas

== See also ==
- Effects of time zones on North American broadcasting
