= Uniform Time Act =

United States timekeeping and daylight saving time law

- Long title: An Act to promote the observance of a uniform system of time throughout the United States.
- Nicknames: Uniform Time Act of 1966
- Enacted by: the 89th United States Congress
- Effective: April 1, 1967

Citations
- Public law: 89-387
- Statutes at Large: 80 Stat. 107

Codification
- Acts amended: Standard Time Act of 1918
- Titles amended: 15 U.S.C.: Commerce and Trade
- U.S.C. sections created: 15 U.S.C. ch. 6, subch. IX §§ 260–267

Legislative history
- Introduced in the Senate as S. 1404 by Sens. Gale McGee (D–WY) and Norris Cotton (R–NH); Passed the House on March 16, 1966 (292–93, in lieu of H.R. 6785); Reported by the joint conference committee on March 30, 1966; agreed to by the House on March 30, 1966 (282–91); Signed into law by President Lyndon B. Johnson on April 13, 1966

The Uniform Time Act of 1966, Pub. L. 89–387, 80 Stat. 107, enacted April 13, 1966, was a law of the United States to "promote the adoption and observance of uniform time within the standard time zones" prescribed by the Standard Time Act of 1918. Its intended effect was to simplify the official pattern of where and when daylight saving time (DST) is applied within the U.S. Prior to this law, each state had its own scheme for when DST would begin and end, and in some cases, which parts of the state should use it.

== History ==
The law, as originally written, required states that observe DST to begin it at 2 a.m. local time on the last Sunday in April, and to end it at 2 a.m. local time on the last Sunday in October and explicitly preempted all state laws related to daylight saving time per the weights and measures power given to Congress in Article 1, Section 8 of the U.S. Constitution. In 1972, the act was amended to allow states with more than one time zone to exempt only one time zone from DST, in addition to exempting the whole state. The law was later amended again in 1986 to move the uniform start date for DST to the first Sunday in April (effective 1987). The latest amendment, part of the Energy Policy Act of 2005, extends DST by four or five weeks by moving the uniform start date for DST to the second Sunday in March and the end date to the first Sunday in November (effective 2007). The Department of Energy was required to report to Congress the impact of the DST extension by December 1, 2007 (nine months after the statute took effect). The report, released in October 2008, reported a nationwide electricity savings of 0.03% for the year of 2007.

=== Specifications ===
The law does not require that all states observe DST. Individual states may exempt themselves from DST and observe standard time year-round by passing a state law, provided:

- if the state lies entirely within a time zone, that the exemption apply statewide, or
- if the state is divided by a time zone boundary, that the exemption apply statewide or to the entire part of the state on one side of the boundary.

== Non-observers ==
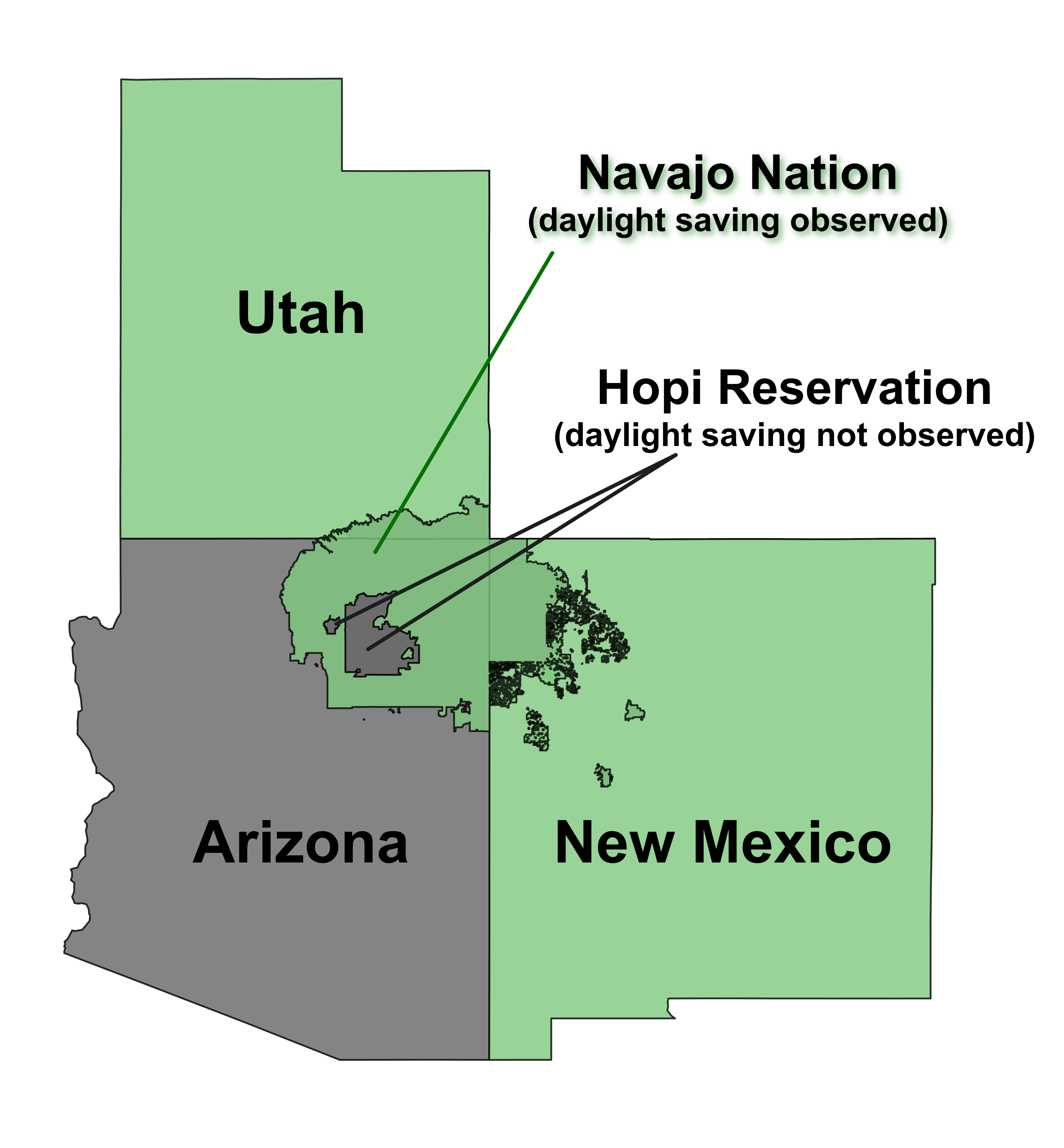
The observance of daylight saving in Arizona varies as shown

The state of Hawaii has never observed daylight saving, even during World War II when it was a territory and "War Time" was observed by the states as an energy saving measure.

The territories of the Northern Mariana Islands, Puerto Rico, American Samoa, Guam, and U.S. Virgin Islands also do not observe Daylight Saving Time.

Observance of daylight saving varied by county in Indiana, which is divided by the Eastern/Central time zone boundary, until April 2, 2006, when the entire state once again observed DST, a first since Congress repealed the Standard Time Act of 1918.

Arizona has not observed daylight saving since the year following the enactment of the Uniform Time Act of 1966. Native American nations within Arizona may choose. The Navajo Nation has chosen to use daylight saving throughout its territory, which includes parts of New Mexico and Utah where daylight saving is observed. The Hopi Nation, with territory surrounded entirely by the Arizona portion of the Navajo Nation, has chosen not to observe daylight saving.

== See also ==
- 1918 Standard Time Act
- Time in Indiana
- Time in Arizona
- Sunshine Protection Act
