= Date and time notation in the Netherlands =

Date and time notation in the Netherlands []
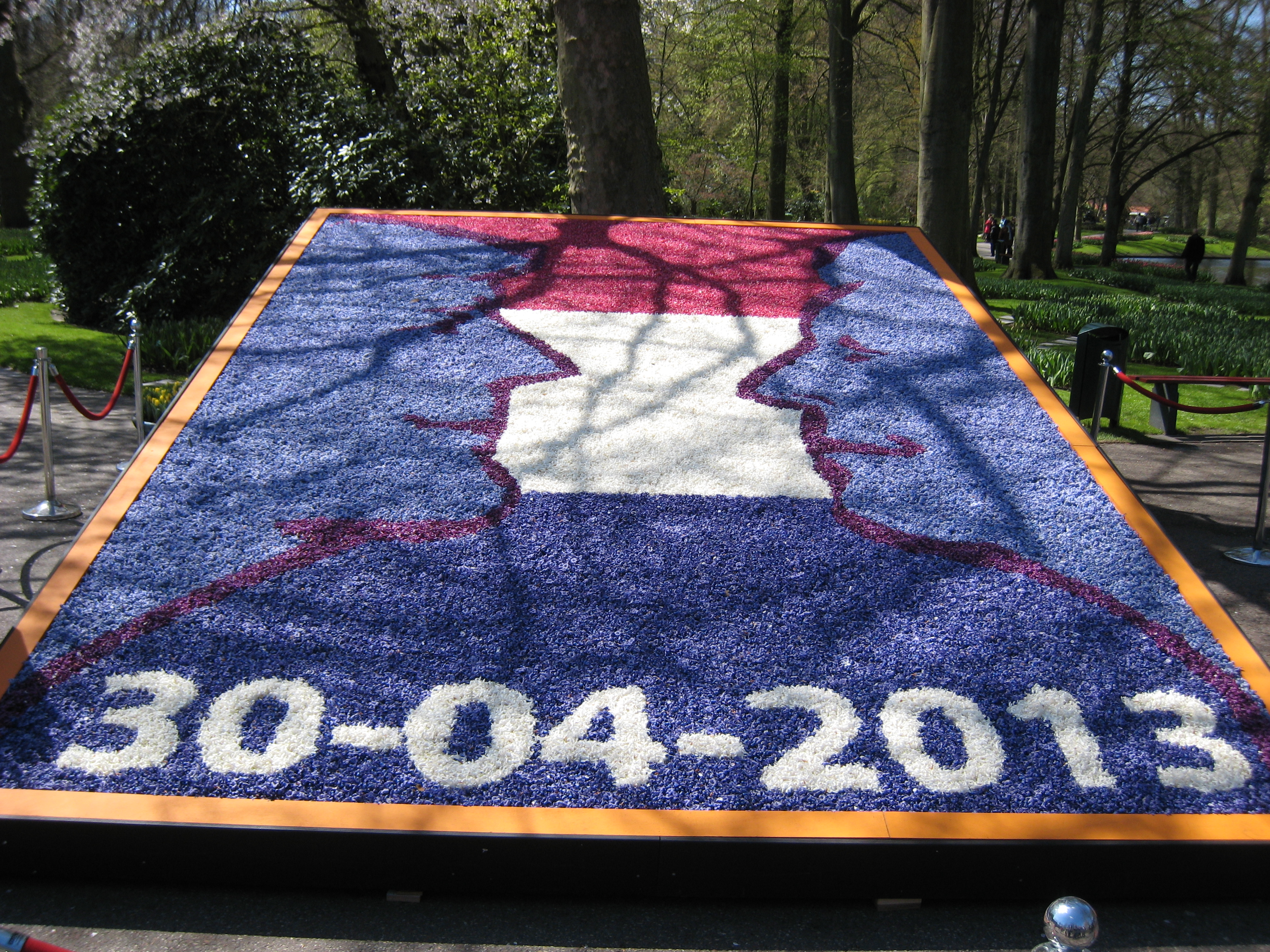
- Date format of the inauguration date of King Willem-Alexander in flowers at Keukenhof

Date and time notation
- Full date: 15 June 2026
- All-numeric date: 15-6-2026; 15-6-'26 15-06-2026; 15-06-'26 15/6/2026; 15/6/'26 15/06/2026; 15/06/'26
- Time: 17:19

Date and time notation in the Netherlands records the date using the day–month–year (DMY) format (31 December 1999 or 31-12-1999, 31/12/'99). The time is written in the 24-hour clock format (23:59).

== Date ==
In the Netherlands, dates are written using the little-endian pattern "day–month–year" (DMY), as is usual elsewhere in Europe and the majority of the world, dashes (-) are typically used as separators, but slashes (/) are used as well. Both dates with or without leading zero's are used, but without leading zero is more common. In less formal texts years may be shortened with an apostrophe when the century can be deduced from context. Weeks start on Monday at 00:00.

- d-m-'yy (10-9-'00)
- dddd dd-mm-yyyy (zondag 10-09-2000)
- dddd dd mmmm yyyy (zondag 10 september 2000)

The names and abbreviations of months and days are as follows (note: names of months and days are not capitalised in Dutch):

English	Dutch	Dutch abbreviation
January	januari	jan.
February	februari	feb.
March	maart	mrt.
April	april	apr.
May	mei	mei
June	juni	juni
July	juli	juli
August	augustus	aug.
September	september	sep.
October	oktober	okt.
November	november	nov.
December	december	dec.

English	Dutch	Dutch abbreviation
Monday	maandag	ma.
Tuesday	dinsdag	di.
Wednesday	woensdag	wo.
Thursday	donderdag	do.
Friday	vrijdag	vr.
Saturday	zaterdag	za.
Sunday	zondag	zo.

== Time ==
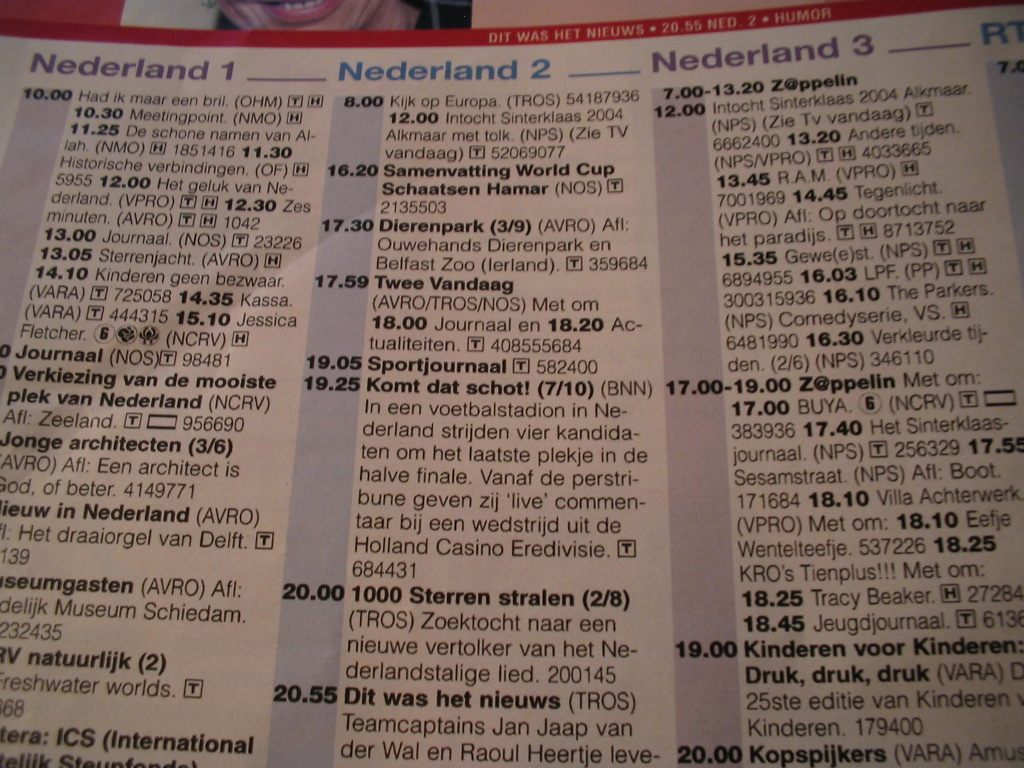
Dutch TV listings magazines invariably use 24-hour notation

In written language, time is expressed in the 24-hour notation, with or without leading zero, using a full stop or colon as a separator, sometimes followed by the word uur (hour) or its abbreviation u. – for example, 22.51 uur, 9.12 u., or 09:12. In technical and scientific texts the use of the abbreviations h, min/m and s is common – for example, 17 h 03 min 16 s. The use of the 12-hour clock in numeric writing is not standard practice, not even in informal writing, and writing e.g., "1.30" for 13:30 would be regarded as odd. The actual Dutch terms for a.m. and p.m. are respectively v.m. and n.m. (voormiddag and namiddag), but these are very old-fashioned and even more rare than the use of a.m. and p.m. in written language.

In spoken language, most often time is expressed in the 12-hour clock. However, "a.m." and "p.m." are never used. Instead, an apposition is added, for instance 21:00 is said as "9 uur 's avonds" (9 o'clock in the evening). Half hours are relative to the next hour – for example, 5:30 is said as "half 6". Quarter hours are expressed relative to the nearest whole hour – for example, 6:15, "kwart over 6" (quarter past six) and 6:45, "kwart voor zeven" (quarter to seven). Minutes are usually rounded off to the nearest five minutes and are expressed relative to the closest half-hour. For instance 05:35 is "5 over half 6" (literally "5 past half to 6") and 05:20 is "tien voor half 6" (literally "10 to half to 6").

When the 24-hour clock is used in spoken language, which is not quite common, usually the written form is pronounced with the hours as a number, the word "uur" (hour) followed by the minutes as a number. For example, 17:21 might be pronounced as "zeventien uur eenentwintig" (seventeen hours twenty-one). Hours over 12 are not usually combined with phrasings using "half", "quarter", "to", or "past".

== See also ==
- Date format by country
- Date and time representation by country
