= 1 P.M. =

1 P.M. is a time on the 12-hour clock.

1 P.M. and variants may also refer to:

- One P.M., 1972 film by D.A. Pennebaker
- "1:00 P.M." (The Pitt season 1), episode 7 from season 1 of The Pitt
- "1:00 P.M." (The Pitt season 2), episode 7 from season 2 of The Pitt
- 1 Pm, or one petameter; a unit of measurement equal to 10^{15} meters

== See also ==
- 12 P.M. (disambiguation)
- 2 P.M. (disambiguation)
