= 3 P.M. =

3 P.M. is a time on the 12-hour clock.

3 P.M. and variants could also refer to:

- 3pm, New Zealand children's show
- "3:00 P.M." (The Pitt season 1), episode 9 from season 1 of The Pitt
- "3:00 P.M." (The Pitt season 2), episode 9 from season 2 of The Pitt

== See also ==
- 2 P.M. (disambiguation)
- 4 P.M. (disambiguation)
