= Date and time notation in Brazil =

Date and time notation in Brazil []
- All-numeric date: 22/01/2026; 22.01.2026
- Time: 10:39; 10 h 39 min

Date and time notation in Brazil records the date using the day–month–year format (22/01/2026 or 22.01.2026). The country follows the national standard NBR 5892:2019 for date and time. It was originally published in 1989 and updated in 2019. In the long format, the day is written as a numeral, followed by the preposition "de" (of), the month written in lowercase, and the year (23 de janeiro de 2024). The time is written using the 24-hour clock (10:39 or 10 h 39 min); in spoken language and informal contexts the 12-hour clock is also commonly adopted.

== Date ==
In Brazil, dates follow the "day month year" order, using a slash as the separator. Example: 20/06/2008 or 20/06/08. Leading zeros may be omitted, specifically on the day and month, but never on the year field: 9/5/08. In formal writing, months are spelled out and not capitalized, e.g., "20 de junho de 2008" (lit. "20 of June of 2008" / English: "20th of June 2008"). Besides, day (except the first) and year numbers are read as ordinals and year numbers are not grouped as in English. So, for instance, Brazilians never say "dezenove dezoito" ("nineteen eighteen") for 1918, but they spell it as "mil, novecentos e dezoito" ("one thousand, nine hundred and eighteen"). Below are some examples of dates and various formats of writing and reading them.

Date: 01/05/1927 or 1/5/1927 or 1^{o} de maio de 1927 or 1o. de maio de 1927.
Read as: primeiro de maio de mil, novecentos e vinte e sete (first of May of one thousand, nine hundred and twenty-seven).
Or informally as: um de maio de vinte e sete. (one of May of twenty-seven).

Note: If the century in question is specified in the context (this is particularly true for years of the twentieth century) only the final part may be read. For example, the above date might be very shortly spelled as "um do cinco de vinte e sete" (one of the five of twenty-seven).

Date: 2/12/1967 or 02/12/1967 or 2 de dezembro de 1967.
Read as: dois de dezembro de mil, novecentos e sessenta e sete (two of December of one thousand, nine hundred and sixty-seven).
Or informally as: dois do doze de mil, novecentos e sessenta e sete (two of the twelve of one thousand, nine hundred and sixty-seven).

Within a month, days are referred to as "no dia"+"ordinal number that corresponds to the date". Let us suppose a test is set up for April 15 and hearers know what the month in question is. In situations like this, the speaker usually says "O teste será no dia quinze" ("The test will be on the day fifteen"). Again, if we suppose the month in question is April, then "(o) dia quinze do mês passado"="(the) day fifteen of last month" means March 15 and "(o) dia quinze do mês que vem"="(the) day fifteen of next month" is used for May 15.

== Time ==
The 24-hour notation is always used in formal and informal writing; an "h" or ":" is used as separator formal writing, e.g., 7h45 (formal) or 14:20 (informal). In formal writing full hours can be written just with an "h", e.g., 6h (not 6h00). It is more common, however, to speak in a 12-hour notation; one usually says "sete da noite" (seven in the night) for 19h.
