= Date and time notation in Spain =

In Spain, date notation follows the DD/MM/YYYY format. Time notation depends on the level of formality and varies in written and spoken formats. Official time is given using the 24-hour clock, and the 12-hour clock is often used in informal speech.

== Date ==
"Seis de diciembre de mil novecientos setenta y ocho" (formal, legal)
"Seis de diciembre del setenta y ocho"(informal, two-digit year abbreviation)

— 6 December 1978, date of the 1978 Spanish constitutional referendum

In Spain, the date order is invariably day, month, year. In abbreviated notation, Roman numerals are sometimes used to represent months. A slash, a hyphen or occasionally a full stop can be used to separate the units of time.

Years are often notated in two-digit format in mainly informal contexts where this would not cause confusion, such as handwritten letters, notes or diaries. Official documents, however, always include all four digits.

In Spanish, the suffixes for BC and AD are "AC" (antes de Cristo, "before Christ") and "DC" (después de Cristo, "after Christ"), respectively. "AD" for "Anno Domini" in Latin is sometimes used instead of "DC", but it is rare. "DC" is commonly omitted for years after 200 AD.

Leading zeroes are rare, and are more frequently used in the months column: 21/04/1980 to allow for consistency in a tabular format. The format 02/04/1980 is more commonplace in automated output, such as tickets, forms, etc.

Names of months and weekdays are written in lower case, as they are considered common nouns rather than proper nouns, except at the start of a sentence, when they are capitalized following the regular rules of Spanish. Exceptions include some specific Catholic holy dates, such as Miércoles de Ceniza ("Ash Wednesday") or Domingo de Resurrección ("Resurrection Sunday"), which are always written in upper case letters.

In Spanish, abbreviations of month names are usually three letters long, to avoid confusion between marzo (March) and mayo (May), and between junio (June) and julio (July).

In Spain, the week runs from Monday to Sunday. The Spanish language also has an established convention for days of the week using one letter. These are: L – lunes (Monday); M – martes (Tuesday); X – miércoles (Wednesday); J – jueves (Thursday); V – viernes (Friday), S – sábado (Saturday); and D – domingo (Sunday). Each day of the week is written using its first letter except Wednesday, which is represented by the letter X in order to avoid confusion between martes (Tuesday) and miércoles (Wednesday), which both begin with an m. Some public vehicles, such as taxicabs, attach a letter to their vehicle to denote the driver's weekly day off.

== Time ==
Common names for hours in Spanish
Time	Hour name	Common suffix
00:00	Las doce	de la noche
01:00	La una	de la madrugada
05:00	Las cinco	de la madrugada
06:00	Las seis	de la mañana
11:00	Las once	de la mañana
12:00	Las doce	del mediodía
13:00	La una	de la tarde
20:00	Las ocho	de la tarde
21:00	Las nueve	de la noche
23:00	Las once	de la noche

Official time is always given in 24-hour format. A full stop was originally used to separate the hours and minutes (18.20). Whilst this method is still in use in some areas such as the press, the colon is preferred in most modern usage (18:20). The use of leading zeroes to mark the hour is optional (these zeroes are most commonly found in situations involving automation), but leading zeroes must be used to mark minutes and seconds, if seconds are included at all (e. g., 08:09:07). In speech, a time given in 24-hour format is always followed by the word horas: el concierto comenzará a las 15:30 "quince y treinta" horas ("the concert will start at 15:30").

Fractional seconds are given in decimal notation, with punctuation marks used to separate the units of time (full stop, comma or single quotation marks). For elapsed time, the letter "h" represents 'hours', a single quotation mark (') represents 'minutes' and a double quotation mark (") represents seconds: 8h 7' 46" means "eight hours, seven minutes and forty-six seconds have elapsed". In this instance, leading zeroes are not used. The letters "m" and "s" are occasionally used to denote minutes and seconds instead of the quotation marks: 8h 7m 46s.

Common names for minutes in Spanish
Time	Hour name	Common minutes name
00:00	Las doce	en punto
00:05	Las doce	y cinco
00:10	Las doce	y diez
00:15	Las doce	y cuarto
00:20	Las doce	y veinte
00:25	Las doce	y veinticinco
00:30	Las doce	y media
00:35	La una	menos veinticinco
00:40	La una	menos veinte
00:45	La una	menos cuarto
00:50	La una	menos diez
00:55	La una	menos cinco

In common spoken language, times are given using the 12-hour clock. After midnight, hours are labeled de la madrugada ("in the early morning"), which is used exclusively before sunrise, and de la mañana ("in the morning"), which can be used either before or after sunrise. Times after 12 noon are labeled de la tarde ("in the afternoon") before sunset and de la noche ("at night") after sunset. The system for minutes is similar to the one used in the English language, with hours expressed first, followed by minutes. The word y ("and") is used to denote minutes past or after the hour (e.g. las cinco y diez for "ten minutes past five"). If more than thirty minutes have elapsed since the last full hour, minutes to the hour are expressed using the word menos ("minus") (e.g. las diez menos cinco; "five minutes to ten"). As in English, the clock face is also split into four quarters: times exactly on the hour are expressed using en punto ("o'clock"); "quarter past" or "quarter after" is expressed using the phrase y cuarto; a time thirty minutes past the hour is expressed using the phrase y media ("half past" or "-thirty"); and a time 15 minutes before the hour is expressed using menos cuarto ("quarter to").

There are no traditional suffixes for ante meridiem and post meridiem in Spanish; "AM" and "PM" are used when writing the time in the 12-hour format, in any of their variations: "A.M./P.M.", "a.m./p.m.", "AM/PM", "am/pm", "a/p" etc. The suffix for ante meridiem is often omitted completely.
