= Date and time notation in Mongolia =

Date and time notation in Mongolia []
- Full date: 2026 оны 7 сарын 16
- All-numeric date: 2026.07.16
- Time: 12:33

This article is about date and time notation in Mongolia.

== Date ==
The date format follows the Mongolian language, which has been big-endian. Consequently, it agrees with year first, month next, and day last. Example: 2017.08.10. A leading zero is optional in practice (mostly not added). Cyrillic characters that mean year, month, and day are often used as separators too. Example: 2017 оны 8 сарын 10. Since the characters clearly label the date, the year may be abbreviated to two digits when this format is used.

In speech, the date is spoken in the same format as it is written. Using the example: пүрэв (pürev), 2017 (Khoyor myanga doloon) оны (ony) 8 (Naiman) сарын (saryn) 10 (Арван).

Ordinal Mongolian is a colloquial term used to express the day of the month instead of cardinal Mongolian. It is rarely used in formal writing. Using the example: пүрэв (pürev), 2017 (Khoyor myanga doloon) оны (ony) 8 (Naiman) сарын (saryn) 10 дахь (Arvan dakhi). Ordinal Mongolian is more often used when the month is understood from the context, i.e.: 10 дахь for the 10th.

Weeks are most often identified by the last day of the week, either the Friday in business (e.g., "08.11 дуусах долоо хоног") or the Sunday in most other use (e.g., "08.13 дуусах долоо хоног"). The first day of the week or the day of an event are referred to (e.g., "08.07 долоо хоног"). The first day of the week is Monday.

== Time ==
The 12-hour clock is often used in spoken language. The 24-hour notation is used in writing, with a colon as the standardised and recommended separator (12:33), although full stops are still very common, even in official contexts.
