= Date and time notation in Rwanda =

- Full date: 13 April 2026 (en); 13 Mata 2026 (kin)
- All-numeric date: 13/04/2026
- Time: 20:11

Rwanda most commonly records the date using the day-month-year order with an oblique stroke or slash ("/") as the separator for numerical values, for example, 31/12/2002. In written and formal contexts, the 24-hour clock is used to express time, using a colon (":") as the separator between hours and minutes, for example, 14:05. However, a dawn-to-dusk 12-hour system is primarily used in spoken Kinyarwanda.

== Date ==
In Rwanda, dates are written using the little-endian sequence (day, month, year), consistent with most of East Africa and Europe. For numeric dates, slashes ("/") are the standard separators.

- dd/mm/yyyy (18/09/2010)
- dddd, dd mmmm yyyy
  - Kinyarwanda: Ku cyumweru, 18 Nzeri 2010
  - English: Sunday, 18 September 2010

When written in English, dates maintain the day–month–year order, typically as a cardinal or ordinal number followed by the full month name and year (e.g., 19 March 2025, 10th March 2026), consistent with British English conventions.

The names and abbreviations of months and days in Kinyarwanda are as follows:

English	Kinyarwanda	Kinyarwanda abbreviation
January	Mutarama	Mut.
February	Gashyantare	Gas.
March	Werurwe	Wer.
April	Mata	Mat.
May	Gicurasi	Gic.
June	Kamena	Kam.
July	Nyakanga	Nya.
August	Kanama	Kan.
September	Nzeri	Nze.
October	Ukwakira	Ukw.
November	Ugushyingo	Ugu.
December	Ukuboza	Uku.

English	Kinyarwanda
Monday	Kuwa mbere
Tuesday	Kuwa kabiri
Wednesday	Kuwa gatatu
Thursday	Kuwa kane
Friday	Kuwa gatanu
Saturday	Kuwa gatandatu
Sunday	Ku cyumweru

Names of months and days are generally not capitalised in Kinyarwanda unless they appear at the beginning of a sentence.

== Week ==
In Rwanda, the first day of the week is Monday, consistent with most of Africa and Europe. This is reflected in the Kinyarwanda names for the days of the week, where Monday (Kuwa mbere) translates literally to "the first day," Tuesday (Kuwa kabiri) to "the second day," and so on through Friday (Kuwa gatanu, "the fifth day"). Saturday (Kuwa gatandatu, "the sixth day") and Sunday (Ku cyumweru, "of the week") complete the cycle.

== Time ==
In written language, formal contexts, and digital interfaces, time is frequently expressed using the 24-hour notation (e.g., 14:30). This is heavily influenced by administrative conventions and international business standards.

However, in spoken language and everyday life, time in Kinyarwanda is counted using a dawn-to-dusk system. This system is heavily borrowed from or closely related to the Swahili method of timekeeping. Historically, as watches were introduced to the region during the colonial era, Rwandans adopted Swahili terminology for telling time, later mixing it with Kinyarwanda vocabulary.

Because timekeeping in this cultural context begins at sunrise rather than midnight, the first hour of daylight (7:00 a.m. in the standard 12-hour clock) is saa moya (hour one), utilising the shared Swahili loanword saa (hour). Therefore, 8:00 a.m. is the second hour, or saa mbiri. This effectively creates a 6-hour offset between the Kinyarwanda and standard methods of counting time.

The following table illustrates the 12-hour cycle of the dawn-to-dusk system used in both Kinyarwanda and Swahili, compared to the standard 12-hour clock:

Standard Time (12-hour clock)	Kinyarwanda	Swahili	Literal Translation
7:00	Saa moya	Saa moja	Hour 1
8:00	Saa mbiri	Saa mbili	Hour 2
9:00	Saa tatu	Saa tatu	Hour 3
10:00	Saa yine	Saa nne	Hour 4
11:00	Saa tanu	Saa tano	Hour 5
12:00	Saa sita	Saa sita	Hour 6
1:00	Saa saba	Saa saba	Hour 7
2:00	Saa munani	Saa nane	Hour 8
3:00	Saa cyenda	Saa tisa	Hour 9
4:00	Saa kumi	Saa kumi	Hour 10
5:00	Saa kumi n'imwe	Saa kumi na moja	Hour 11
6:00	Saa kumi n'ebyiri	Saa kumi na mbili	Hour 12

To distinguish between day and night, an apposition or descriptive phrase is added to the time, such as ya mugitondo or za mu gitondo (in the morning), z'amanywa (of the day), or ya nimugoroba / za nijoro (of the night/evening). For example, 20:00 (8:00 p.m. in the 12-hour clock) would be spoken as saa mbiri za nijoro (the second hour of the night).

== Number notation ==
In Rwanda, the decimal separator is a dot (".") and the thousands separator is a comma (","), which aligns with the standards of English-speaking and Commonwealth countries. For example, one million Rwandan francs is written as 1,000,000.00.

== See also ==
- Date format by country
- Swahili time
