= 12 P.M. (disambiguation) =

12 P.M. refers to the time on the 12-hour clock, or noon/midday.

12 P.M. or variants may also refer to:

- "12:00 P.M." (The Pitt season 1), episode 6 from season 1 of The Pitt
- "12:00 P.M." (The Pitt season 2), episode 6 from season 2 of The Pitt

== See also ==
- 12 (disambiguation)
- 12 o'clock (disambiguation)
- Noon (disambiguation)
- Midday (disambiguation)
