= Date and time notation in Russia =

In Russia, dates are usually written in "day month year" (DMY) order. The 12-hour notation is often used in the spoken language, and the 24-hour notation is used in writing.

== Date ==
=== Present ===
In Russia, dates are usually written in "day month year" (DMY) order. This order is used in both the all-numeric date (for example "28.08.17") and the expanded form (for example "28 августа 2017 г."); the trailing "г" is short for "года" (goda, "of the year"). Coincidentally, in Polish the word for year is "rok", so a similar date format is used by the Poles e.g. 1987r). Single-digit numbers for day or month may have a preceding zero (for example "28.08.2017") is more usual.

When saying the date, it is usually pronounced using the ordinal number of the day first (in neutral grammatical gender), then the month in genitive case (for example "Двадцать восьмое августа"). In colloquial speech, it is acceptable to pronounce the date in numerical format (for example, 15.09.2024).

The first day of the week in Russia is Monday.

=== Historical ===
Russia used the Byzantine calendar up to 1700, the Julian calendar between 1700 and 1918, and the Gregorian calendar since 1918. Until the final years of Peter the Great in the early 1720s, Russia used Cyrillic numerals to denote dates on coins. Thus, for example, СИ (208) denoted 7208 AM (which began on 1 September 1699 became a short year with only four months, running from 1 September 1699 through 31 December 1699 (O.S.)) and ҂АѰ (1700) denoted AD 1700 OS (which began on 1 January).

== Time ==
The 12-hour notation is often used in the spoken language. The 24-hour notation is used in writing, with a colon as the standardized and recommended separator (e.g. “9:07”). Sometimes full stop is used as a separator (e.g. 9.07), or (in handwritten text) the minutes may be written as superscript and underlined (e.g. 9^{07}).
