= Date and time notation in Australia =

Date and time notation in Australia []
- Full date: 13 November 2026
- All-numeric date: 13/11/2026
- Time: 3:33 am

The date and time in Australia are most commonly recorded using the day–month–year format (13 November 2026) and the 12-hour clock (3:33 am), although 24-hour time is used in some cases. For example, some public transport operators such as V/Line and Transport for NSW use 24-hour time, although others use 12-hour time instead.

== Date ==
Australians typically write the date with the day leading, as in the United Kingdom and in New Zealand:

- 13 November 2026
- 13/11/2026

The month–day–year order (November 13, 2026) is occasionally used, often in the mastheads of magazines, newspapers, advertisements, video games, news, and TV shows; however, this is not an official standard and is often discouraged to avoid confusion. Month–day–year in numeric-only form (11/13/2026) is rarely used and also often discouraged.

The ISO 8601 date format (2026-11-13) is recommended by the government to be used when communicating internationally. It is also commonly used in software.

The Australian government identifies Monday as the first day of the week, which is consistent with the Common Locale Data Repository (CLDR) since its October 2021 release. However, there is disagreement among the general population over whether Monday or Sunday is the first day of the week.

Weeks are most identified by the last day of the week, either the Friday in business (e.g., "week ending 19/1") or the Sunday in other use (e.g., "week ending 21/1"). Week ending is often abbreviated to "W/E" or "W.E." The first day of the week or the day of an event are sometimes referred to (e.g., "week of 15/1"). Week numbers (as in "the third week of 2007") are not often used, but may appear in some business diaries in numeral-only form (e.g., "3" at the top or bottom of the page). ISO 8601 week notation (e.g. 2026-W46) is not widely understood.

== Time ==
The Australian government recommends using the 12-hour clock (3:33 am), except where the 24-hour clock is more helpful in the context, such as in travel, scientific fields and the military. The government also recommends a colon as the separator; however, the full stop is still used in some contexts. They also suggest writing the noon/after noon qualifier as "am" or "pm" in lower case without a full stop.
