= Date and time notation in Pakistan =

Date and time notation in Pakistan is based on the Gregorian and Islamic calendars. Pakistan has not officially adopted any time and date representation standard based on the ISO 8601.

== Date ==
Government documents and transactions use "DD/MM/YYYY" format when writing in English, Urdu or in Pakistan's regional languages; examples of this can be found on the Pakistani passport application form, the National Identity Card or the Pakistan Origin Card.

=== Days of the week ===
	Sunday	Monday	Tuesday	Wednesday	Thursday	Friday	Saturday
Urdu	اتوار; Itwar	پیر; Peer	منگل; Mangal	بدھ; Bodh	جمعرات; Jumarat	جمعہ; Jumah	ہفتہ; Haftah
Balochi	Jatti; Yaq shamby	Suub سوب	Mulom مولم	Sakim ساکم	Sheker شکر	Jummah / Adeneg جمعہ /آدینگ	Ganji گنجی
Balti	Adeed ادید	Tsumdral تسمدرال	Angaru انگرو	Botu بوتو	Brespod برسپود	Jummah / Shugoru جمعہ / شوگرو	Shingsher شنگشر
Brahui							
Burushaski	Adit ادِت	Tsandura ژَندُرَہ	Angaro اَنگارو	Bodo بودو	Birespat بِریسپَت	Jummah / Shukro جمعہ / شُکرو	Shimsher شِمشیر
Chitrali (Khowar)	Yakshambey یک شمبے	Doshambey دو شمبے	Seshambey سہ شمبے	Charshambey چار شمبے	Pachambey پچھمبے	Adina آدینہ	Shambey شمبے
Hindko	Atwaar اتوار	Suwar سؤ وار	Mungal منگل	Budh بدھ	Jumiraat جمعرات	Jummah جمعہ	Khali خالي
Kashmiri	Ātwār آتھوار	Tsạndrüwār ژٔنٛدرٕوار	Bọnwār بۄنٛوار or Bōmwār بوموار	Bọdwār بۄدوار	Bryaswār برٛؠسوار or Braswār برَٛسوار	Jumāh جُمعہ Shokurwār شۆکُروار	Baṭüwār بَٹہٕ وار
Pashto	Itwār اِتوار	Gul ګل	Naha نهه	Shoro شورو	Ziārat زيارت	Jumma جمعه	Xāli خالي
Pothwari/Pahari	Taar تار	Suwar سؤ وار	Mangalar منگالار	Badhar بادهار	Jumāy-rāt جمعرات	Jummah جمعہ	Baar بار
Punjabi (Shahmukhi)	Ittvār/Āḍitvār اِتّوار/آڈِتوار	Somvār/Suṃvār سوموار/سن٘وار	Maṃgal من٘گل	Buddh بُدّھ	Jumme'rāt جُمِّعرات	Jumma'h جُمّعہ	Chaṇchaṇ/Śanicar چھݨچھݨ/شنیچر
Shina	Adit ادت	Tsunduro تسوندرو	Ungaro نگرو	Budo بوڈو	Brespat بیرسپات	Jummah / Shukur جمعہ / شوکر	Shimsher شمشر
Seraiki	Āḍit آڈت	Sunwar / Somar سنوار / سومار	Mangal منگل	Budh بدھ	Khamees خمیس	Juma جمعہ	Chandh Chandh چھنڑ چھنڑ
Sindhi	Ācharu آچَرُ	Sūmaru سُومَرُ	Angaro اَنڱارو	Arbā اَربع	Khamīsa خَميِسَ	Jum'o جُمعو	Chancharu ڇَنڇَرُ
Wakhi (X̌ikwor)	Yakshambi یک شمبی	Dushambi دو شمبی	Seshambi سہ شمبی	Chorshambi چہور شمبی	Ponjambi پونجشمبی	Juma جمعہ	Shambi شمبی

=== Months of the year ===
	January	February	March	April	May	June	July	August	September	October	November	December
Urdu	جنوری	فروری	مارچ	اپریل	مئ	جون	جولائ	اگست	ستمبر	اکتوبر	نومبر	دسمبر
Balochi												
Balti												
Brahui												
Burushaski												
Chitrali (Khowar)												
Hindko												
Kashmiri	Māg ماگ	Phāgun پھاگُن	Tsithür ژِتھٕر	Vahyakh وَہؠکھ or Bēsākh بیساکھ	Zēṭh زیٹھ	Hār ہار	Shrāvun شرٛاوُن	Bạ̄dürpyath بٲدٕرپؠتھ or Bạ̄dryath بٲدرؠتھ	Ạ̄shid ٲشِد	Kārtikh کارتِکھ	Manjhor مَنٛجہۆر or Mọnjihōr مۄنٛجہِ ہور or Magar مَگَر	Pōh پوہ or Pọh پۄہ
Pashto	Salwāğa سلواغه	Kab کب	Wray وری	Ğwayay غویی	Ğbargulay غبرګلی	Čangāx چنګاښ	Zmaray زمری	Wagay وږی	Tala تله	Laŕm لړم	Līnd لیند	Marğumay مرغومی
Pothwari/Pahari	Māgh ماگھ	Phaggaṇ پھگݨ	Chēt چیت	Vasākh وساکھ	Jēṭh جیٹھ	Hāṛh ہاڑھ	Sāoṇ ساؤݨ	Bhādron بھادروں	Assū اسو	Kattak کتک	Magghar مگھر	Poh پوہ
Punjabi (Shahmukhi)	Māgh ماگھ	Phaggaṇ پھگݨ	Chēt چیت	Vasākh وساکھ	Jēṭh جیٹھ	Hāṛh ہاڑھ	Sāoṇ ساؤݨ	Bhādon بھادوں or Bhādron بھادروں	Assū اسو	Kattak کتک	Magghar مگھر	Poh پوہ
Shina												
Seraiki												
Sindhi	Mānghu مانگھُه	Phaguṇu ڦَڳُڻُ	Chēṭu چيٽُ	Vēsāku ويساکُ or Vihāu وِهاءُ	Jēṭhu ڄيٺُ	Ākhāṛu آکاڙُ or Āhāṛu آهاڙُ	Sānvaṇu سانوَڻُ	Baḍo بَڊو or Baḍro بَڊرو	Asū اَسُو	Katī ڪَتِي	Nāhrī ناهرِي or Manghiru مَنگهِرُ	Pohu پوهُه
Wakhi	Panz Toqʉsh پانز توقُش	Thrʉ Toqʉsh تُھرو توقُش	Yi Toqʉsh یی توقُش	Haba ہبہ	Tomʉs توموس	Khʉm Pac خُم پس	Hama Pac ہَمہ پَس	Shʉndr Poč̣ شوندر پوچھ	Sʉr Poč̣ سئور پوچھ	δasyi Toqʉsh دسیئی توقُش	Now Toqʉsh نو توقُش	Hʉb Toqʉsh ہُب توقُش

== Time ==
In terms of time usage, both the 24-hour clock and 12-hour clock are widely used in the country. The 12-hour notation is widely used in daily life, written communication, and is used in spoken language. The 24-hour notation is used in situations where there would be widespread ambiguity. Examples include railway timetables, plane departure and landing timings, and TV schedules.
