= 30-hour clock =

30 Hours or 30-hour clock may refer to:

- 30 Hours, a song by American rap musician Kanye West
- Muhurta, a Hindu unit of measurement for time
- Date and time notation in Japan, which extends 00:00 ~ 06:00 (exclusive) of next day to 24:00 ~ 30:00 (exclusive) of current day
- Famine events, charity events usually last for 30 hours
