= Date and time notation in Italy =

Date and time notation in Italy []
- Full date: giovedì 26 febbraio 2026; 26 febbraio 2026
- All-numeric date: 26/2/2026; 26/02/2026; 2026-02-26 (uncommon)
- Time: 20:53; 8:53 (informal)

Date and time notation in Italy records the date using the day–month–year format (26 febbraio 2026 or 26/2/2026). The time is written using the 24-hour clock (20:53); in spoken language and informal contexts, the 12-hour clock is more commonly adopted, but without using "a.m." or "p.m." suffixes (8:53).

== Date ==
In Italy, the all-numeric form for dates is in the day–month–year format, using a stroke as the separator; sometimes a dot or a hyphen is used instead of the stroke. Years can be written with two or four digits; day and month are traditionally written without zero padding (1/9/1985) although forms and computing made it common (01/09/1980). Long dates are expressed optionally with the day of the week. Months and weekdays are written with a lowercase letter since they are not considered proper nouns.

- martedì 2 giugno 1992 or 2 giugno 1992
- 2/6/1992 or 2/6/92 – 02/06/1992

In written and spoken language, a date or year is preceded by the definite article (with or without the preposition "in"):

- il 2 giugno 1992 or nel 2 giugno 1992
- l'8 marzo 2010 or nell'8 marzo 2020
- il 1985 o nel 1985; l'85 o nell'85

The first day of the month is usually written 1º dicembre or 1° dicembre; 1 dicembre is possible but less desirable. This can either be pronounced il primo dicembre ("the first of December") or l'uno dicembre ("the one of December"), even if the latter may be considered unsatisfactory or wrong. The other days of the month always follow the cardinal form. Two-digit years may be used in the expanded form, elided with an apostrophe: "2 giugno '92", although this notation is considered informal and less preferable. More rarely, three-digit years may also be found: "2 giugno '992".

In letter writing, the date is preceded by the place in which the letter has been written, usually with the definite article:

- Roma, il 2 giugno 1992
- Roma, 2 giugno 1992

The archaic plural article li (a variant of the current plural articles i or gli) still endures in bureaucratic correspondence but should be avoided. The article originally referred to "days" (Firenze, li 15 giorni di giugno), which became commonly implied in use (Firenze, li 15/6/1992). It is also not uncommon to read lì ("there") in official documents, an incorrect form originated by the erroneous interpretation of the article as an adverb of place.

An unfamiliar format is year–month–day, explicitly used in computing contexts to avoid ambiguity from DMY format (1992-12-31). The first day of the week in Italy is Monday, but for the Church the first day is Sunday.

== Time ==
Official time is always given in 24-hour format. The 24-hour notation is used in writing with a dot or a colon as a separator. Example: 14.05 or 14:05. It is also common to use the comma as a separator (14,05), even if this is generally considered incorrect. The minutes are written with two digits; the hour numbers can be written with or without zero padding (02:05 or 2:05).

In oral communication, 12-hours are prominently used since 24-hours are considered very formal. In 12-hours, hour figures are always preceded by the definite article and a.m. or p.m. are never used. L'una di pomeriggio is 1 p.m. (1 in the afternoon), le due (di pomeriggio) is 2 p.m., le tre (di pomeriggio) is 3 p.m. etc. Hours after sunset or dusk (but in some cases even just after noon) are given as le sette di sera ("7 in the evening"), le otto di sera (8 in the evening) and so on until 11 p.m. which is le undici di sera. Midnight is simply mezzanotte. Following hours are l'una (di notte) (1 a.m., "1 in the night"), le due (di notte) (2 a.m.) or sometimes l'una del mattino (1 in the morning), le due del mattino. After dawn, hours are le otto (del mattino) (8 a.m.), le nove (del mattino) (9 a.m.) until 11 a.m. Midday (noon) is mezzogiorno. 12-hours may be used with approximate time, such as le tre e un quarto (a quarter past three) or with precise time (le tre e diciotto, 03:18 or 15:18). Whether one is referring to a.m. or p.m. is generally implicit in the context of the conversation; otherwise, more information must be provided to avoid confusion: le tre e diciotto del pomeriggio (3:18 p.m.).

In some parts of the country (e.g., Tuscany and Sardinia) only mattina and sera are used in everyday speech: thus, le due di sera is 2 p.m. or 14:00 and le due di mattina is 2 a.m. or 02:00. Furthermore, in Tuscany, until recent times, l'una was virtually unknown: Tuscans used to say il tocco ("the toll", referring to the church bell) instead for both 1 p.m. or 13:00 and 1 a.m. or 01:00.
