= Date and time notation in South Korea =

Date and time notation in South Korea []
- Full date: 2026년 7월 8일; 2026년 07월 08일
- All-numeric date: 2026-07-08
- Time: 오후 4:04; 16:04

The most formal manner of expressing the full date and/or time in South Korea is to suffix each of the year, month, day, ante/post-meridiem indicator, hour, minute and second (in this order, i.e. with larger units first) with the corresponding unit and separating each with a space:

- 년 (年; nyeon) for year;
- 월 (月; wol) for month;
- 일 (日; il) for day;
- 오전 (午前; ojeon) for a.m.; 오후 (午後; ohu) for p.m.; (Note: Unicode provides a way to represent 오전 and 오후 as single parenthesized characters: U+321D ㈝ PARENTHESIZED KOREAN CHARACTER OJEON and U+321E ㈞ PARENTHESIZED KOREAN CHARACTER O HU. However, these single characters cannot be used in South Korea because they are from North Korea (from KPS 9566).)
- 시 (時; si) for hour;
- 분 (分; bun) for minute; and
- 초 (秒; cho) for second.

For example, the ISO 8601 timestamp 1975-07-14 09:18:32 would be written as "1975년 7월 14일 오전 9시 18분 32초".

The same rules apply when expressing the date or the time alone, e.g., "1975년 7월 14일", "1975년 7월", "7월 14일", "14일 오전 9시 18분" and "오전 9시 18분 32초".

The national standard (KS X ISO8601, formerly KS X 1511) also recognizes the ISO-8601-compliant date/time format of YYYY-MM-DD HH:MM:SS, which is widely used in computing and on the Korean internet.

== Date ==
In Government's written documents, the date form above (but not the time) is abbreviated by replacing each unit suffix with a single period; for example, 2001년 11월 29일 would be abbreviated as "2001. 11. 29." (note the trailing period and intervening spaces as this is of importance).

== Time ==
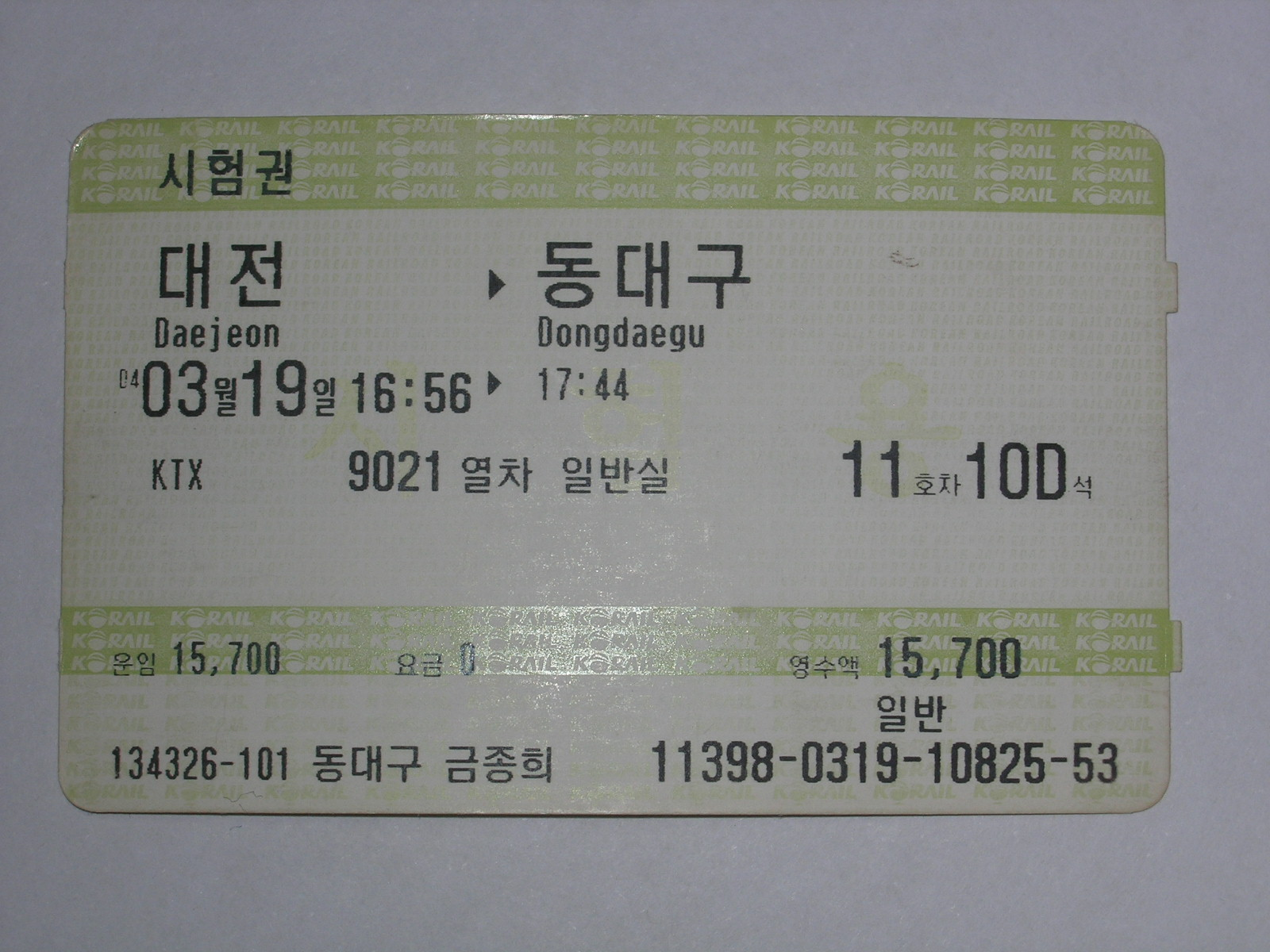
Test ticket for KTX trial run, using the 24-hour notations

Both the 12-hour and 24-hour notations are widely used in South Korea.

12-hour clock is predominantly used in informal daily life, and the ante/post-meridiem indicator is often omitted where doing so does not introduce ambiguity.

Half past the hour is commonly—especially in spoken Korean—abbreviated as 반 (ban), which literally means "half"; for example, 13:30 is either expressed as "오후 1시 30분" or "오후 1시 반".

When the time is expressed in the HH:MM:SS notation, the Roman ante/post-meridiem indicators (AM and PM) are also used frequently. In addition, they sometimes follow the convention of writing the Korean-style indicator before the time; it is not uncommon to encounter times expressed in such a way, e.g., "AM 9:18" instead of "9:18 AM".

Two words, 정오 (jeongo) and 자정 (jajeong), are sometimes used to indicate 12:00 and 0:00 respectively—much in the same way the English words "noon" and "midnight" are used.

The 24-hour notation is more commonly used in text and is written "14:05" or "14시 5분". Examples include railway timetables, plane departure and landing timings, and TV schedules. In movie theaters it is also not uncommon to see something like "25:30" for the 01:30 AM movie.
