= Date and time notation in Japan =

Date and time notation in Japan []
- Gregorian full date: 2026年6月8日
- Gregorian all-numeric date: 2026/06/08
- Japanese era date: 令和8年6月8日
- Weekday: (月); 月曜日
- Time: 11:05

Date and time notation in Japan has historically followed the Japanese calendar and the nengō system of counting years. At the beginning of the Meiji period, Japan switched to the Gregorian calendar on Wednesday, 1 January 1873, but for much domestic and regional government paperwork, the Japanese year is retained. Japanese people and businesses have also adopted various conventions in accordance with their use of kanji, the widespread use of passenger trains, and other aspects of daily life.

== Date ==
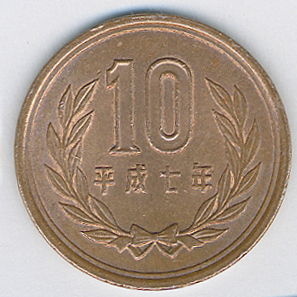
Japanese 10 yen coin. The date beneath the "10" reads 平成七年 Heisei year 7, or the year 1995.

The most commonly used date format in Japan is "year month day (weekday)", with the Japanese characters meaning "year", "month" and "day" inserted after the numerals. Example: 2023年12月31日 (日) for "Sunday 31 December 2023". The weekday is usually abbreviated to a single character, e.g. 日 for 日曜日 ("Sunday"), but may also be written in full, then usually without surrounding parentheses. Apart from the Gregorian calendar, the Japanese imperial calendar is also used, which bases the year on the current era, which began when the current emperor acceded to the throne. The current era is 令和, Reiwa and began in 2019. The imperial year increments on January 1 just like the Gregorian, not on the anniversary of the emperor's enthronement. When using the imperial calendar, the year is prefixed with the era. For example, the above date using the imperial calendar is written as: 令和5年12月31日 (日); a more direct translation might be: Reiwa year 5, Dec 31 (Sun). The first year of the emperor's reign is written as 元年, gannen, not 1年, ichi nen.

Either form may be abbreviated as yy/mm/dd; periods as separators are not uncommon either. Examples: 5/12/31, 23/12/31, 23.12.31. Ambiguities as to which calendar is used for the year are usually only resolved by the context in which the date appears, but imperial calendar dates may be prefixed with a single character or letter denoting the era, e.g. 令5/12/31 or R5/12/31. This is a shorthand notation and full dates are often the preferred way of resolving such ambiguities.

== Time ==
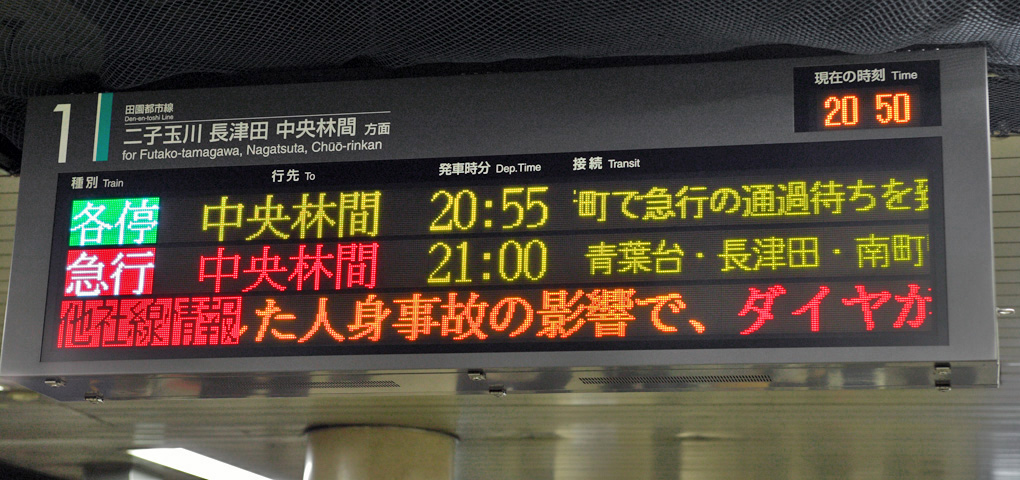
Information board at Shibuya Station, Tokyo, showing train listings and departure times. The current time is at top right in orange.

Both the 12-hour and 24-hour notations are commonly used in Japan. The 24-hour notation is commonly used in Japan, especially in train schedules. The 12-hour notation is also commonly used, by adding 午前 ("before noon") or 午後 ("after noon") before the time, e.g. 午前10時 for 10 am. Japanese broadcasting and newspapers usually use a modified 12-hour notation in which midnight is 午前0時 (0 am) and noon is 午後0時 (0 pm) and, for example, "quarter past midnight" is 午前0時15分. The AM/PM signs are also used, while the sign may be placed either before or after the time (AM10:00 or 10:00AM).

Using the Japanese notation, times are written as "8時42分", with the characters for "hour" and "minute" (optionally also 秒 for "seconds") added after the numerals. It is also common to simply write 8:42.

=== Times past midnight ===
Times past midnight can also be counted past the 24 hour mark, usually when the associated activity spans across midnight. For example, bars or clubs may advertise as being open until "30時" (i.e. 6 am) (See ja:30時間制). This is partly to avoid any ambiguity (6 am versus 6 pm), partly because the closing time is considered part of the previous business day, and perhaps also due to cultural perceptions that the hours of darkness are counted as part of the previous day, rather than dividing the night between one day and the next. Television stations will also frequently use this notation in their late-night scheduling. This 30-hour clock form is rarely used in conversation.
