= Six-hour clock =

Six-hour clock may refer to:

- Thai six-hour clock
- Italian six-hour clock
