= Date and time notation in Sweden =

Date and time notation in Sweden mostly follows the ISO 8601 standard: dates are generally written in the form YYYY-MM-DD. Although this format may be abbreviated in a number of ways, almost all Swedish date notations state the month between the year and the day. Months are not capitalised when written. The week number may also be used in writing and in speech. Times are generally written using 24-hour clock notation, with full stops (dots or periods) as separators, although 12-hour clock notation is more frequently used in speech.

== Date ==
In Sweden, the ISO 8601 standard is followed in most written Swedish, but older forms remain. Dates are generally and officially written in the form YYYY-MM-DD, for instance 2001-08-31 for 31 August 2001, or using the full format (31 augusti 2001). Dates can also be shortened, allowing for two-digit years, so the dates are usually written in the form YY-MM-DD, which means that 31 August 2001 can also be written as 01-08-31. One can also omit the hyphens, leaving the notation as 010831. Older forms for 31 August 2001 are 31/8 2001, or with the two-digit notation 31/8 -01. The common trait for all Swedish date notations is that the month (August or 8) always is between the year (01) and the day (31st). Months are not capitalised when written using letters (i.e. augusti, not Augusti).

The "month, day, year" notation ("08-31-2001") is not used in Swedish, but may be used in Lule Sami, Northern Sami and Southern Sami languages.

The numbering of weeks is frequently used in companies and schools, and is simply expressed as in "(vecka) 32" (week) 32 in both writing (abbreviated v.) and speech. On labels and in computer notation, the year may also be included, as in "2006W32". As in the ISO standard, the week begins on a Monday and week 1 is the week containing the year's first Thursday.

== Time ==
Times are written with the 24-hour clock, with full stops as separators (although colons are sometimes used instead of full stops, due to the influence from digital clocks). However, seconds are usually left out if the additional precision is not required; for example: 23.59, or sometimes 23.59.00. Leading zeros are mostly used in time notation (i.e. 04.00 is more common than 4.00). They can sometimes even be spoken, as a way to avoid am/pm ambiguity. In spoken Swedish however, the 12-hour clock is much more common.

The written notation can be spoken as-is, with "and" between the hour and minute. For example, 14.27 would be "fjorton och tjugosju" (fourteen and twenty-seven). In combination with "past" or "to", the 12-hour clock is used, as in "tre minuter i halv tre" (three minutes to half three), "tjugosju minuter över två" (twenty seven minutes past two). 16.00 may be pronounced as "fyra" (four) or "sexton" (sixteen). As in any language, seconds are never spoken. Time is usually rounded to the nearest multiple of 5, 15, or 20 minutes depending on context.

Examples of ways of expressing time in spoken Swedish, translated:

- Six [6 am or 6 pm]
- Eighteen and thirty [18:30]
- Twenty (minutes) past seven [7:20 am or pm]
- Ten (minutes) to eight [7:50 am or pm]
- Quarter past nine (kvart över nio) [9:15 am or pm]
- Quarter to eleven (kvart i elva) [10:45 am or pm]
- Half two [1:30 am or pm] (note that this is different from the British expression "half two", the latter being short for "half past two", i.e. 2:30)
- Five (minutes) to half three [2:25 am or pm]
- Five (minutes) past half four [3:35 am or pm]

As indicated, the word for "minutes" is usually left out. The "five to half" and "five past half" phrases are often used without specifying the hour, since that kind of precision is most common in a context where you are adjusting a time already discussed.
