= 4 P.M. =

4 P.M. may refer to:

- A time on the 12-hour clock
- 4 P.M. (group)
- "4 P.M.", song from Stand Back! Here Comes Charley Musselwhite's Southside Band
- "4:00 P.M." (The Pitt season 1), episode 10 from season 1 of The Pitt
- "4:00 P.M." (The Pitt season 2), episode 10 from season 2 of The Pitt

== See also ==
- 4 O'Clock
- "Dallas 4pm", song by Tiesto
