= Italian six-hour clock =

Historic timekeeping system

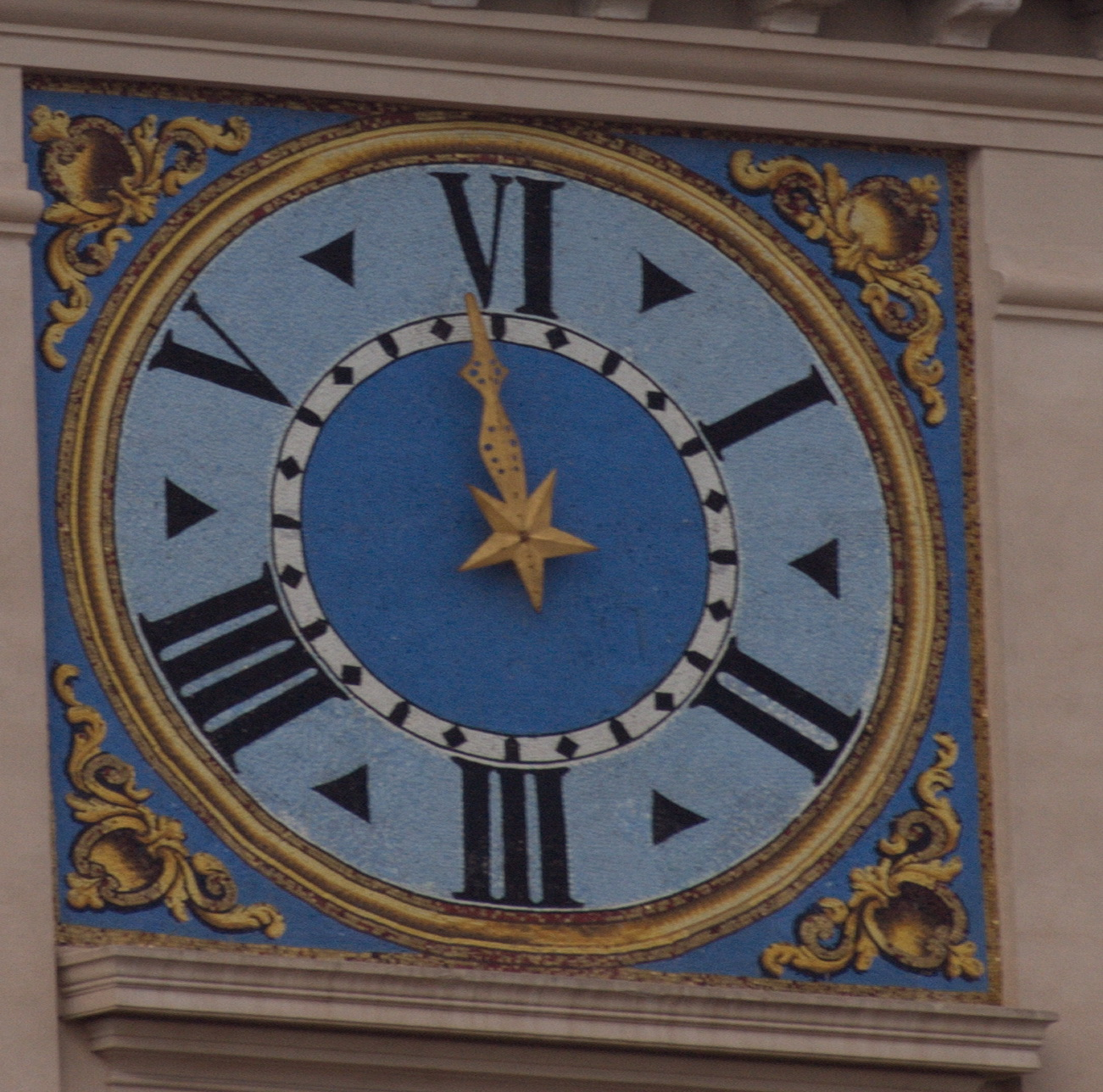
Six-hour clock at the Quirinal Palace, Rome

The six-hour clock (Italian: sistema orario a sei ore), also called the Roman (alla romana) or the Italian (all'italiana) system, is a system of date and time notation in Italy which was invented before the modern 24-hour clock. In this system, the day starts at the evening, at the end of twilight, approximately half an hour after sunset, and the following 24 hours are divided into four cycles of six hours each.

Historically, several other ancient timekeeping systems are known to have begun the day at twilight. In this case the practice in Italy dates to the Middle Ages, in the Papal States whence it spread to other parts of central Italy. It originates from the monastic tradition of dividing the day according to prayer times. While common from the 1400s to the 1600s, it was replaced by the 12-hour clock first in the north, and in the south around the early 1800s.

Many historic buildings in Italy feature old clock faces divided into six hours, which make four revolutions per day.

A clock which counts only six hours has the advantage of being much simpler mechanically, as the wider gaps between the hour markings mean that the time can be clearly marked using only a single hand.

== See also ==
- The Thai six-hour clock, another six-hour system.
