= Date and time notation in Africa =

Date and time notation in Africa describes how date and time are counted all over the African continent and nations

== East Africa ==
=== Time ===
For multi-lingual speakers in East Africa, the convention is to use the time system applicable to the language one happens to be speaking at the time. A person speaking of an early morning event in English would report that it happened at eight o'clock. However, in repeating the same facts in Swahili, one would state that the events occurred at saa mbili ('two hours').

This difference arises because Swahili timekeeping begins at sunrise rather than midnight. The first hour of daylight (7:00 a.m. in the Western system) is saa moja (hour one). Therefore, 8:00 a.m. is the second hour, or saa mbili. This effectively creates a 6-hour offset between the Swahili and Western methods of counting time.

This dawn-to-dusk system is shared by other languages in the region. In Kinyarwanda, not only is the time counted in the exact same manner, beginning at daybreak, but the vocabulary used is also heavily borrowed from or closely related to Swahili. Historically, as watches were introduced to the region, Rwandans adopted Swahili terminology for telling time, later mixing it with Kinyarwanda vocabulary. Using the shared loanword saa (hour), 7:00 a.m. translates to saa moya (hour one), and 8:00 a.m. is saa mbiri (hour two). Similarly, the Ganda form, ssawa bbiri, is equivalent to the Swahili in that it means literally 'two hours' and shares the same linguistic root.

== See also ==
- Date and time representation by country
