= Date and time notation in Iran =

In Iran, short dates are written as MONTH-DAY-YEAR, for example ۲۰۰۸-۲۹-۰۱, and long dates as day month name year from right to left, for example nni یمیم-۲۹-۲۰۰۸. Both two-digit and four-digit years are valid but months and days are not usually padded with leading zeros.
