= 12 o'clock =

12 o'clock refers to:

- Noon
- Midnight
- The corresponding clock position, straight ahead or directly above

12 o'clock may also refer to:

- 12 O'Clock (film), a 1958 Bollywood film
- 12 'O' Clock (film) a 2020 Bollywood film
- 12 O'Clock (rapper), Wu-Tang Clan affiliate and MC
- 12:00 (Loona EP), 2020
- Twelve O'Clock Point, a community in Quinte West, Ontario, Canada
- "12 O'Clock" (in two parts), a song by Vangelis from Heaven and Hell

== See also ==
- Twelve O'Clock High, a 1949 American war film about aircrews in the United States Army's Eighth Air Force
- Twelve O'clock Knob (Roanoke County, Virginia), a mountain located in southwestern Roanoke County, Virginia
