= Midday (disambiguation) =

Midday refers to noon, the time of the middle of the day-light period when the sun is at its highest point.

Midday may also refer to:

== Television ==
- Midday (Canadian TV program), a 1985–2000 Canadian television newsmagazine television program
- Midday (Australian TV program), a 1985–1998 Australian variety program
- Midday (Irish talk show), a 2008–2016 Irish talk show

== Other ==
- Lady Midday, a Slavic demon
- Midday (horse), British-trained thoroughbred racehorse foaled in 2006
- Mid-Day, a compact newspaper in India
- Midday (painting), by Evgenia Antipova
- Southern Italy (Italian: Mezzogiorno, literally "Midday"), referring to the southern portion of the country
- Southern France (French: Midi standing for "Midday"), referring to the southern portion of the country
- Mid Day, a named train of the PATrain commuter rail service
