= 2 P.M. =

2 P.M. or 2PM may refer to:

- The time 2:00 p.m. as represented on the 12-hour clock
- 2PM, a South Korean boy band
- Still 02:00PM, an EP by 2PM
- The RT-2PM Topol, a mobile intercontinental ballistic missile in Russia
- 2PM, a radio station based in Port Macquarie, NSW, Australia, currently owned by Broadcast Operations Group
- Patrick Mahomes II (born 1995), Kansas City Chiefs quarterback nicknamed "2PM"
- "2:00 P.M." (The Pitt season 1), episode 8 from season 1 of The Pitt
- "2:00 P.M." (The Pitt season 2), episode 8 from season 2 of The Pitt
