= 24-hour clock =

Timekeeping convention

The modern 24-hour clock is the convention of timekeeping in which the day runs from midnight to midnight and is divided into 24 hours. This is indicated by the hours (and minutes) passed since midnight, from 00(:00) to 23(:59), with 24(:00) as an option to indicate the end of the day. This system, as opposed to the 12-hour clock, is the most commonly used time notation in the world today, (Note: See the Common Locale Data Repository for detailed data about the preferred date and time notations used across the world, as well the locale settings of major computer operating systems, and the article Date and time representation by country.) and is used by the international standard ISO 8601.

A number of countries, particularly English speaking, use the 12-hour clock, or a mixture of the 24- and 12-hour time systems. In countries where the 12-hour clock is dominant, some professions prefer to use the 24-hour clock. For example, in the practice of medicine, the 24-hour clock is generally used in documentation of care as it prevents any ambiguity as to when events occurred in a patient's medical history.

== Description ==
Notation according to various authorities
24-hour clock	12-hour clock
00:00	midnight 12:00 p.m. (Note: See: 12-hour clock § Confusion at noon and midnight) (start of the day); 12:00 a.m. (start of the day)
01:00	1:00 a.m.
02:00	2:00 a.m.
03:00	3:00 a.m.
04:00	4:00 a.m.
05:00	5:00 a.m.
06:00	6:00 a.m.
07:00	7:00 a.m.
08:00	8:00 a.m.
09:00	9:00 a.m.
10:00	10:00 a.m.
11:00	11:00 a.m.
12:00	midday noon 12:00 a.m. (start of the day); 12:00 p.m.
13:00	1:00 p.m.
14:00	2:00 p.m.
15:00	3:00 p.m.
16:00	4:00 p.m.
17:00	5:00 p.m.
18:00	6:00 p.m.
19:00	7:00 p.m.
20:00	8:00 p.m.
21:00	9:00 p.m.
22:00	10:00 p.m.
23:00	11:00 p.m.
24:00 (00:00 of next day)	midnight 12:00 p.m. (start of the day); 12:00 a.m. (start of the day) (end of the day)

World map showing the usage of 12 or 24-hour clock in different countries 24-hour written Both written by different groups 12-hour written (except in special circumstances such as aviation)

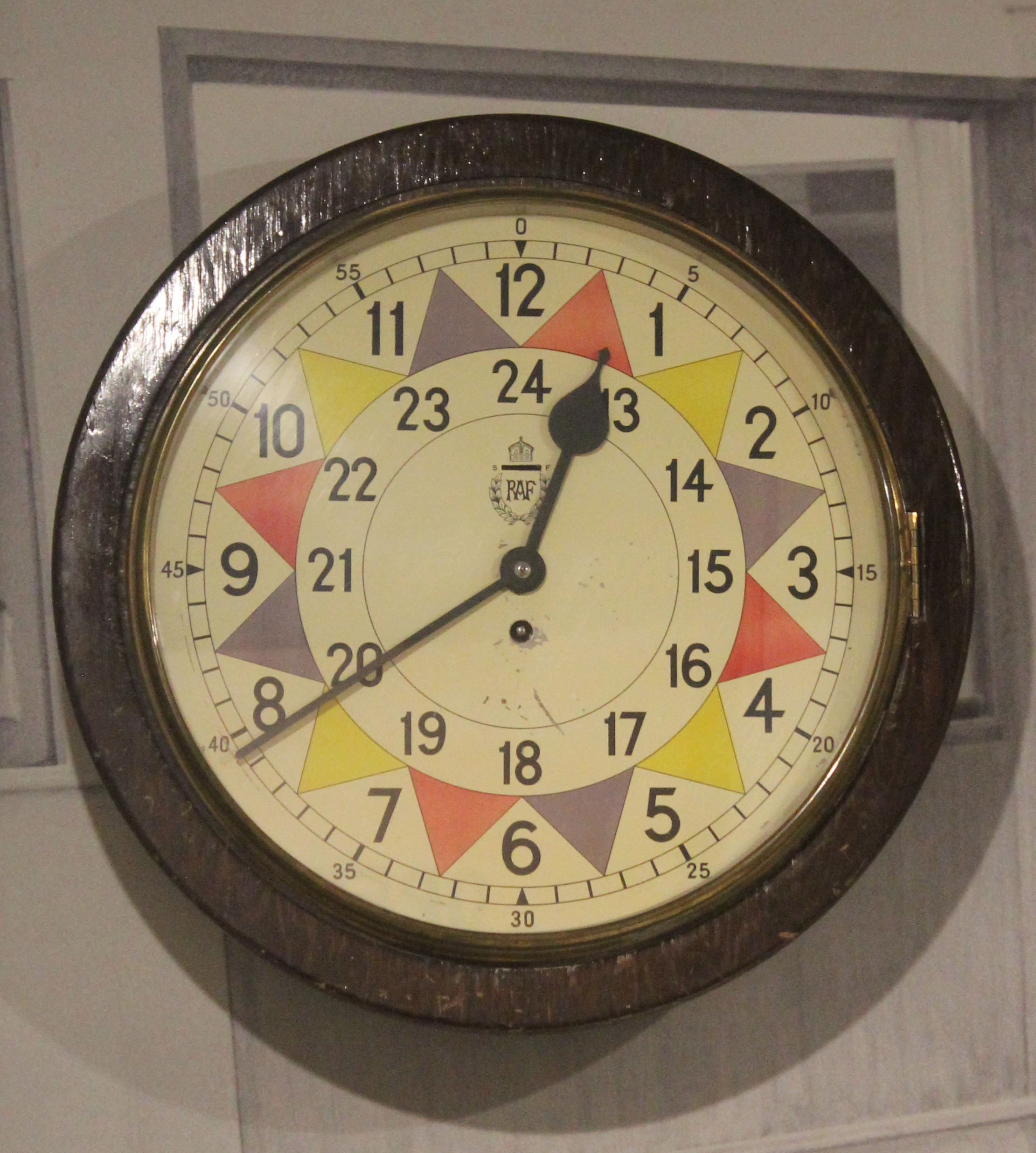
World War II RAF sector clock that can be read in 24-hour notation.

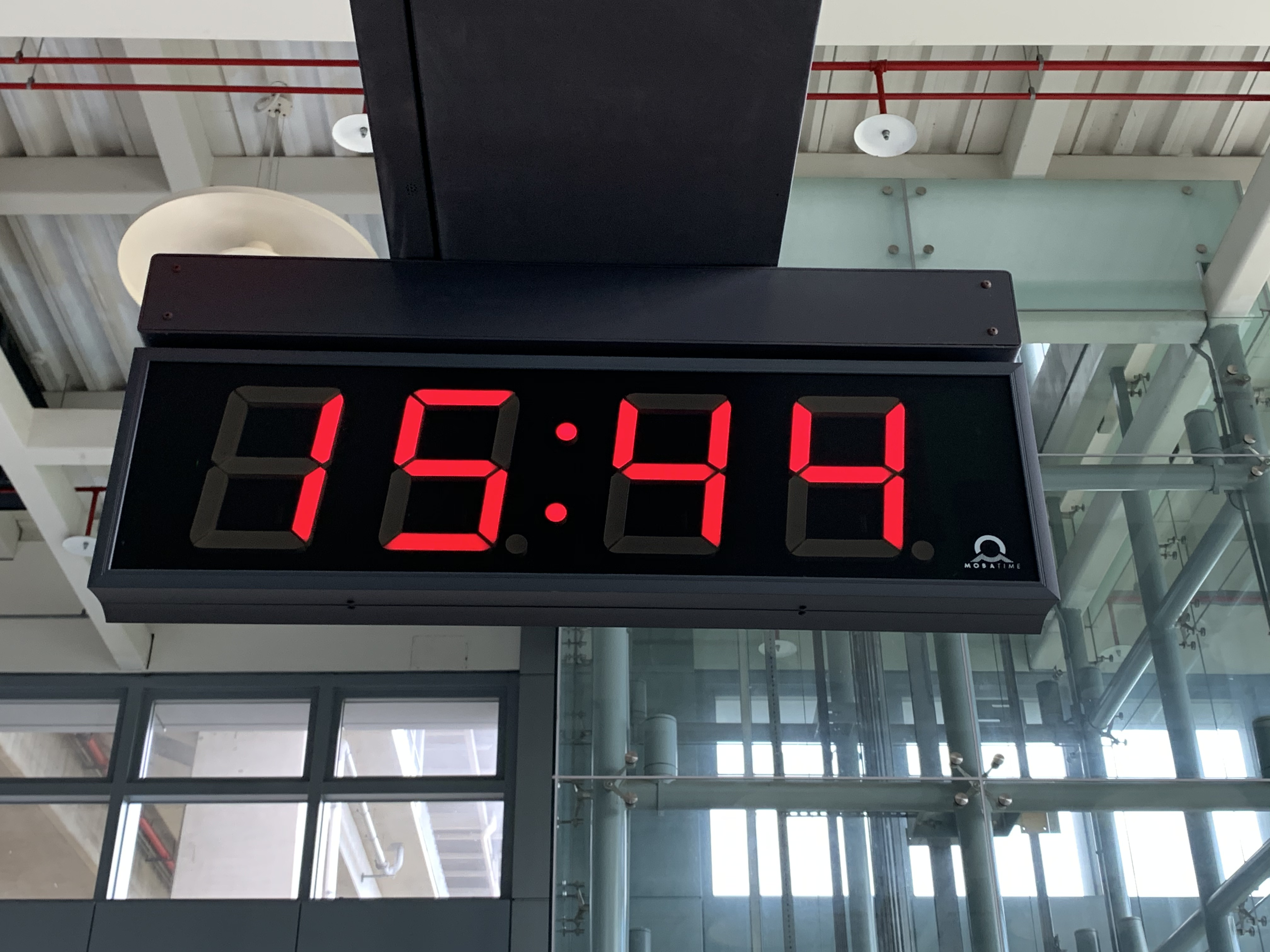
24-hour digital clock in Miaoli HSR station.

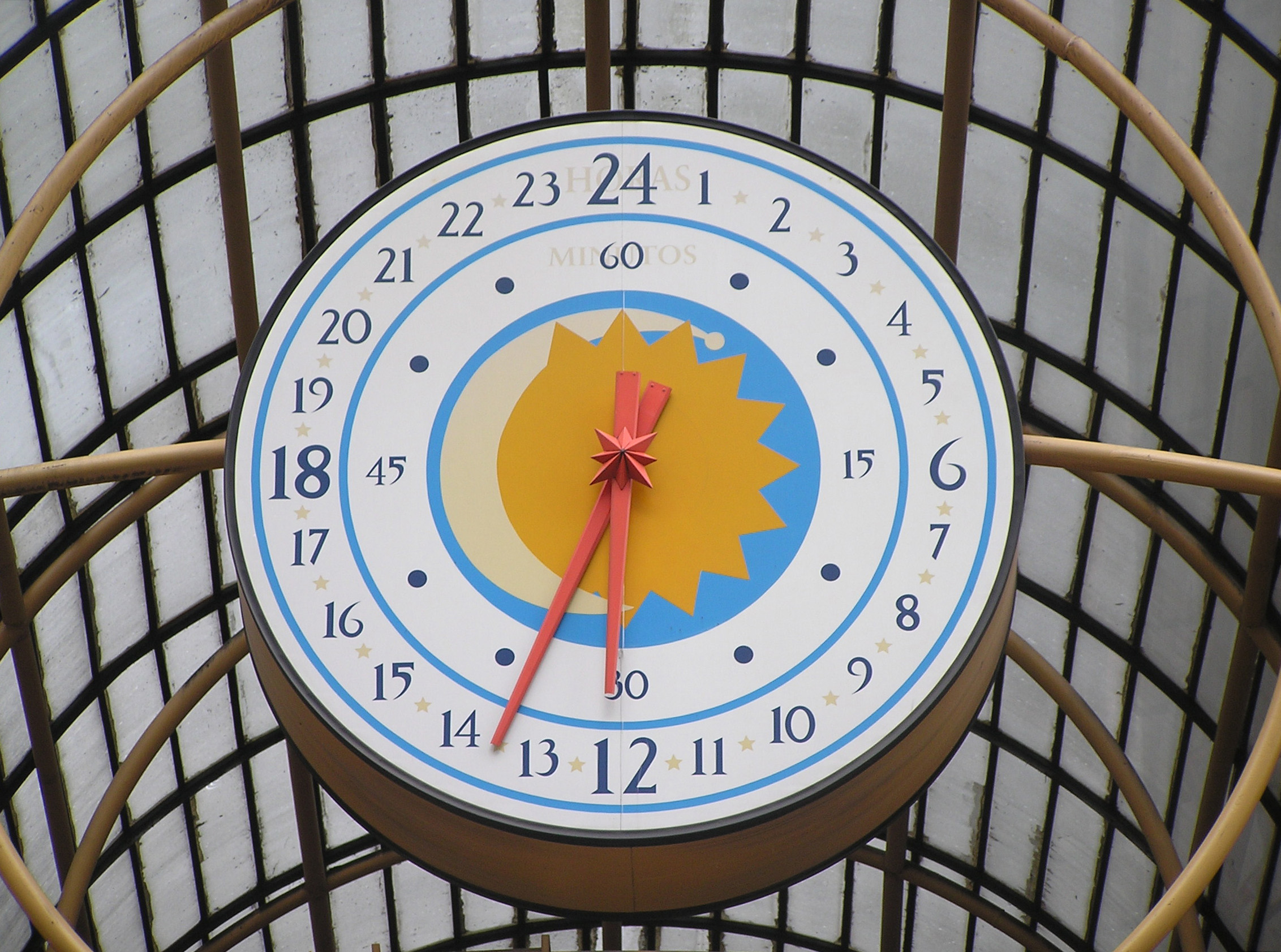
A public 24-hour clock in Curitiba, Brazil, with the hour hand on the outside and the minute hand on the inside.

A time of day is written in the 24-hour notation in the form hh:mm (for example 01:23) or hh:mm:ss (for example, 01:23:45), where hh (00 to 23) is the number of full hours that have passed since midnight, mm (00 to 59) is the number of full minutes that have passed since the last full hour, and ss (00 to 59) is the number of seconds since the last full minute. To indicate the exact end of the day, hh may take the value 24, with mm and ss taking the value 00. In the case of a leap second, the value of ss may extend to 60. A leading zero is added for numbers under 10, but it is optional for the hours. The leading zero is very commonly used in computer applications, and always used when a specification requires it (for example, ISO 8601).

Where subsecond resolution is required, the seconds can be a decimal fraction; that is, the fractional part follows a decimal dot or comma, as in 01:23:45.678. The most commonly used separator symbol between hours, minutes and seconds is the colon, which is also the symbol used in ISO 8601. In the past, some European countries used the dot on the line as a separator, but most national standards on time notation have since then been changed to the international standard colon. In some contexts (including some computer protocols and military time), no separator is used and times are written as, for example, "2359".

=== Midnight 00:00 and 24:00 ===
In the 24-hour time notation, the day begins at midnight, 00:00 or 0:00, and the last minute of the day begins at 23:59. In the ISO 8601 notation, 24:00 may also be used to refer to midnight at the end of a given date — that is, 24:00 of one day is the same time as 00:00 of the following day.

The notation 24:00 mainly serves to refer to the exact end of a day in a time interval. A typical usage is giving opening hours ending at midnight (e.g. "00:00–24:00", "07:00–24:00"). Similarly, some bus and train timetables show 00:00 as departure time and 24:00 as arrival time. Legal contracts often run from the start date at 00:00 until the end date at 24:00.

While the 24-hour notation unambiguously distinguishes between midnight at the start (00:00) and end (24:00) of any given date, there is no commonly accepted distinction among users of the 12-hour notation. Style guides and military communication regulations in some English-speaking countries discourage the use of 24:00 even in the 24-hour notation, and recommend reporting times near midnight as 23:59 or 00:01 instead. Sometimes the use of 00:00 is also avoided. In variance with this, an older version of the correspondence manual for the United States Navy and United States Marine Corps specified 0001 to 2400. The manual was updated in June 2015 to use 0000 to 2359.

=== Times after 24:00 ===
Time-of-day notations beyond 24:00 (such as 24:01 or 25:00 instead of 00:01 or 01:00) are not commonly used and not covered by the relevant standards. However, they have been used occasionally in some special contexts in the United Kingdom, France, Spain, Canada, Japan, South Korea, Hong Kong, and China where business hours extend beyond midnight, such as broadcast television production and scheduling. The GTFS public transport schedule listings file format has the concept of service days and expects times beyond 24:00 for trips that run after midnight.

=== Computer support ===
In most countries, computers by default show the time in 24-hour notation. For example, Microsoft Windows and macOS activate the 12-hour notation by default only if a computer is in a handful of specific language and region settings. The 24-hour system is commonly used in text-based interfaces. POSIX programs such as ls default to displaying timestamps in 24-hour format.

=== Military time ===
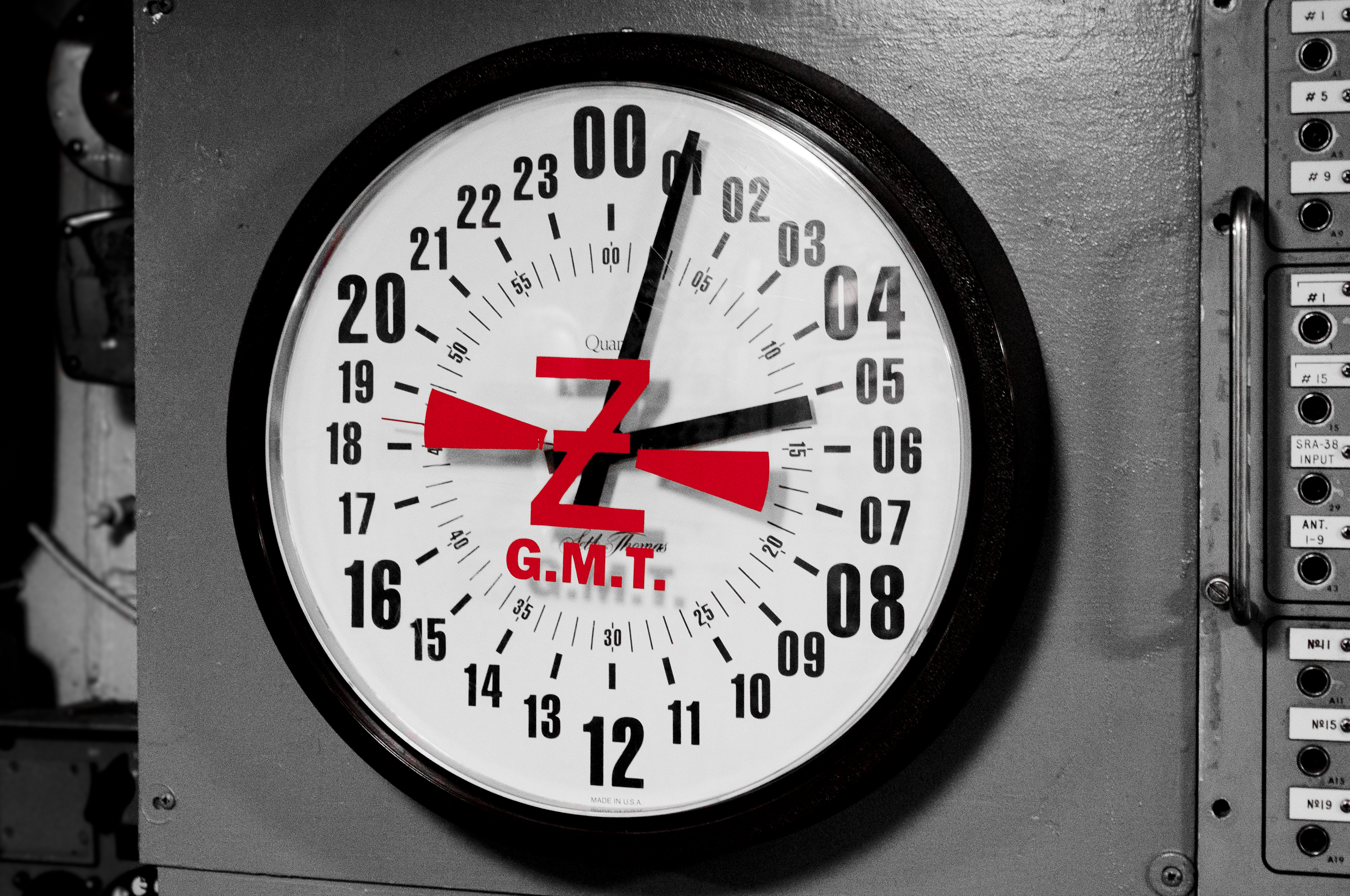
24-hour clock as seen on the USS Midway (CV-41)

In the United States (a country which uses 12-hour clocks), the 24-hour clock is often referred to as military time. There is, however, a more specific standard for military time which refines the acceptable written and spoken forms of times on the 24-hour clock. The 24-hour clock is rarely used in the United States, seeing common use only in certain fields, like aviation, navigation, tourism, meteorology, astronomy, computing, logistics, emergency services, hospitals, military, where the ambiguities of the 12-hour notation are deemed too inconvenient, cumbersome, or dangerous.

Military usage, as agreed between the United States and allied English-speaking military forces, standardizes some aspects of the 24-hour clock:

- No hours/minutes separator is used when writing the time, and a letter designating the time zone is appended (for example "0340Z").
- Leading zeros are always written out and are required to be spoken, so 5:43 a.m. is spoken "zero five forty-three" (casually) or "zero five four three" (military radio), as opposed to "five forty-three" or "five four three".
- Military time zones are lettered and given word designations from the NATO phonetic alphabet. For example, in US Eastern Standard Time (UTC−5), which is designated time zone R, 2:00 a.m. is written "0200R" and spoken "zero two hundred Romeo".
- Local time is designated as zone J or "Juliett". "1200J" ("twelve hundred Juliett") is noon local time.
- Greenwich Mean Time (GMT) or Coordinated Universal Time (UTC) is designated time zone Z, and thus called "Zulu time". (When used as a modern time zone, in practice, GMT and UTC coincide. For other purposes there may be a difference of about a second.)
- Hours are always "hundred", never "thousand"; 1000 is "ten hundred" not "one thousand"; 2000 is "twenty hundred" not "two thousand".

== History ==
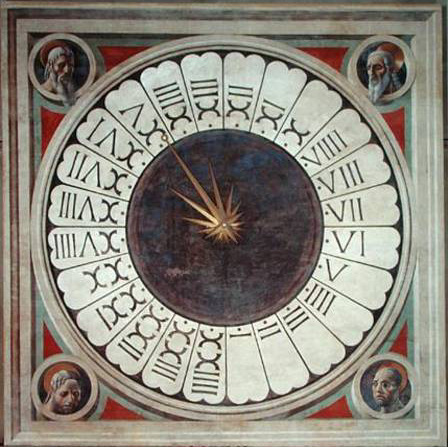
Paolo Uccello's Face with Four Prophets/Evangelists (1443) in Florence Cathedral

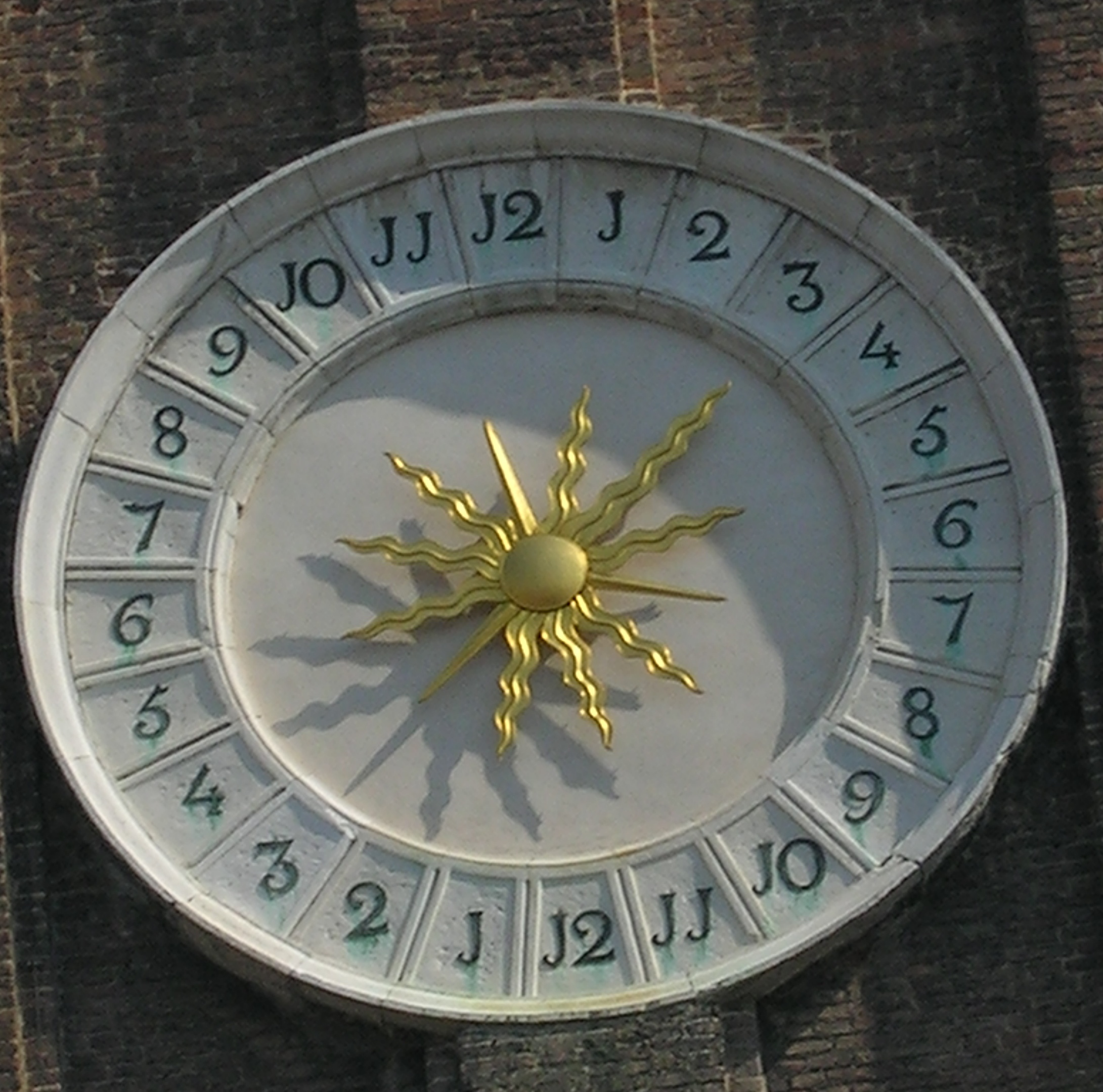
The 24-hour tower clock in Venice that lists hours 1 to 12 twice

The first mechanical public clocks introduced in Italy were mechanical 24-hour clocks which counted the 24 hours of the day from one-half hour after sunset to the evening of the following day. The 24th hour was the last hour of day time.

From the 14th to the 17th century, two systems of time measurement competed in Europe:

- Italian (Bohemian, Old-Bohemian) hours (full-dial): 24 hours system with the day starting after sunset; on the static dial, the 24th hour was on the right side. In Italy, it was prevalently modified to a 4×6 hours system, but some 24-hour dials lasted until the 19th century. The system has spread especially to the Alpine countries, Czech countries and Poland. In Bohemia, this system was finally banned in 1621 after the defeat on White Mountain. The Prague Astronomical Clock struck according to the Old Bohemian Clock until its destruction in 1945. The variant with counting from dawn is also rarely documented and used, e.g. on a 16th-century cabinet clock in the Vienna Art-History Museum.
- German (Gallic) hours (half-dial): 2×12 hour system starting at midnight and restarted at noon. It is typical with the 12-hour dial with 12 at the top.

The modern 24-hour system is a late-19th century adaptation of the German midnight-starting system, and then prevailed in the world with the exception of some Anglophone countries.

Striking clocks had to produce 300 strokes each day, which required a lot of rope, and wore out the mechanism quickly, so some localities switched to ringing sequences of 1 to 12 twice, or 1 to 6 repeated four times.

Sandford Fleming, the engineer-in-chief of the Canadian Intercolonial Railway, was an early proponent of using the 24-hour clock as part of a programme to reform timekeeping, which also included establishing time zones and a standard prime meridian. At the International Meridian Conference in 1884, the following resolution was adopted by the conference:

That this universal day is to be a mean solar day; is to begin for all the world at the moment of midnight of the initial meridian coinciding with the beginning of the civil day and date of that meridian, and is to be counted from zero up to twenty-four hours.

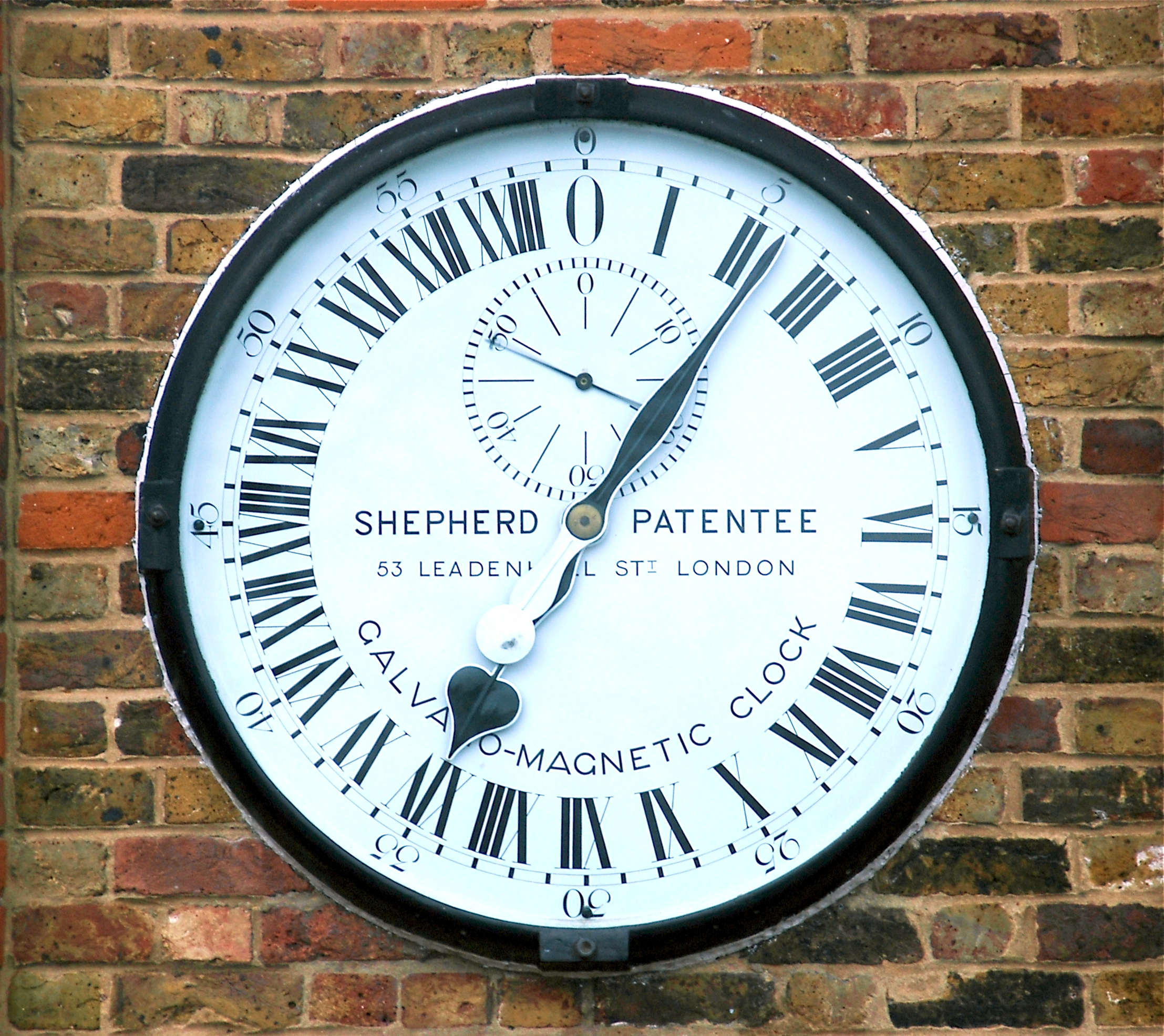
The Shepherd Gate Clock with Roman numerals up to XXIII (23) and 0 for midnight, in Greenwich

The Canadian Pacific Railway was among the first organisations to adopt the 24-hour clock, at midsummer 1886. A report by a government committee in the United Kingdom noted Italy as the first country among those mentioned to adopt 24-hour time nationally, in 1893. Other European countries followed: France adopted it in 1912 (the French army in 1909), followed by Denmark (1916), and Greece (1917). By 1920, Spain, Portugal, Belgium, and Switzerland had switched, followed by Turkey (1925), and Germany (1927). By the early 1920s, many countries in Latin America had also adopted the 24-hour clock. Some of the railways in India had switched before the outbreak of the war.

During World War I, the British Royal Navy adopted the 24-hour clock in 1915, and the Allied armed forces followed soon after, with the British Army switching officially in 1918. The Canadian armed forces first started to use the 24-hour clock in late 1917. In 1920, the United States Navy was the first United States organisation to adopt the system; the United States Army, however, did not officially adopt the 24-hour clock until 1 July 1942.

The use of the 24-hour clock in the United Kingdom has grown steadily since the beginning of the 20th century, although attempts to make the system official failed more than once. In 1934, the British Broadcasting Corporation (BBC) switched to the 24-hour clock for broadcast announcements and programme listings. The experiment was halted after five months following a lack of enthusiasm from the public, and the BBC continued using the 12-hour clock. In the same year, Pan American World Airways Corporation and Western Airlines in the United States both adopted the 24-hour clock. In modern times, the BBC uses a mixture of both the 12-hour and the 24-hour clock. British Rail, London Transport, and the London Underground switched to the 24-hour clock for timetables in 1964. A mixture of the 12- and 24-hour clocks similarly prevails in other English-speaking Commonwealth countries: French speakers have adopted the 24-hour clock in Canada much more broadly than English speakers, and Australia as well as New Zealand also use both systems.

== See also ==
- 24-hour analog dial
- Date and time representation by country
- Decimal time
- Hindu units of time
- Italian six-hour clock
- Metric time
- Thai six-hour clock
- Traditional Chinese timekeeping
