= 12-hour clock =

Time counting system

The 12-hour clock is a time convention in which the 24 hours of the day are divided into two periods: a.m. (from Latin ante meridiem, translating to "before midday") and p.m. (from Latin post meridiem, translating to "after midday"). Each period consists of 12 hours numbered: 12 (acting as 0), 1, 2, 3, 4, 5, 6, 7, 8, 9, 10, and 11. The 12-hour clock has been developed since the second millennium BC and reached its modern form in the 16th century.

The 12-hour time convention is common in several English-speaking nations and former British colonies, as well as a few other countries. In English-speaking countries: "12 p.m." usually indicates noon, while "12 a.m." means midnight, but the reverse convention has also been used (see § Confusion at noon and midnight). "Noon" and "midnight" are unambiguous.

Notation according to various authorities
| 24-hour clock | 12-hour clock |
|---|---|
| 00:00 | midnight 12:00 p.m. (Note: See: 12-hour clock § Confusion at noon and midnight) (start of the day); 12:00 a.m. (start of the day) |
| 01:00 | 1:00 a.m. |
| 02:00 | 2:00 a.m. |
| 03:00 | 3:00 a.m. |
| 04:00 | 4:00 a.m. |
| 05:00 | 5:00 a.m. |
| 06:00 | 6:00 a.m. |
| 07:00 | 7:00 a.m. |
| 08:00 | 8:00 a.m. |
| 09:00 | 9:00 a.m. |
| 10:00 | 10:00 a.m. |
| 11:00 | 11:00 a.m. |
| 12:00 | midday noon 12:00 a.m. (start of the day); 12:00 p.m. |
| 13:00 | 1:00 p.m. |
| 14:00 | 2:00 p.m. |
| 15:00 | 3:00 p.m. |
| 16:00 | 4:00 p.m. |
| 17:00 | 5:00 p.m. |
| 18:00 | 6:00 p.m. |
| 19:00 | 7:00 p.m. |
| 20:00 | 8:00 p.m. |
| 21:00 | 9:00 p.m. |
| 22:00 | 10:00 p.m. |
| 23:00 | 11:00 p.m. |
| 24:00 (00:00 of next day) | midnight 12:00 p.m. (start of the day); 12:00 a.m. (start of the day) (end of the day) |

== History and use ==
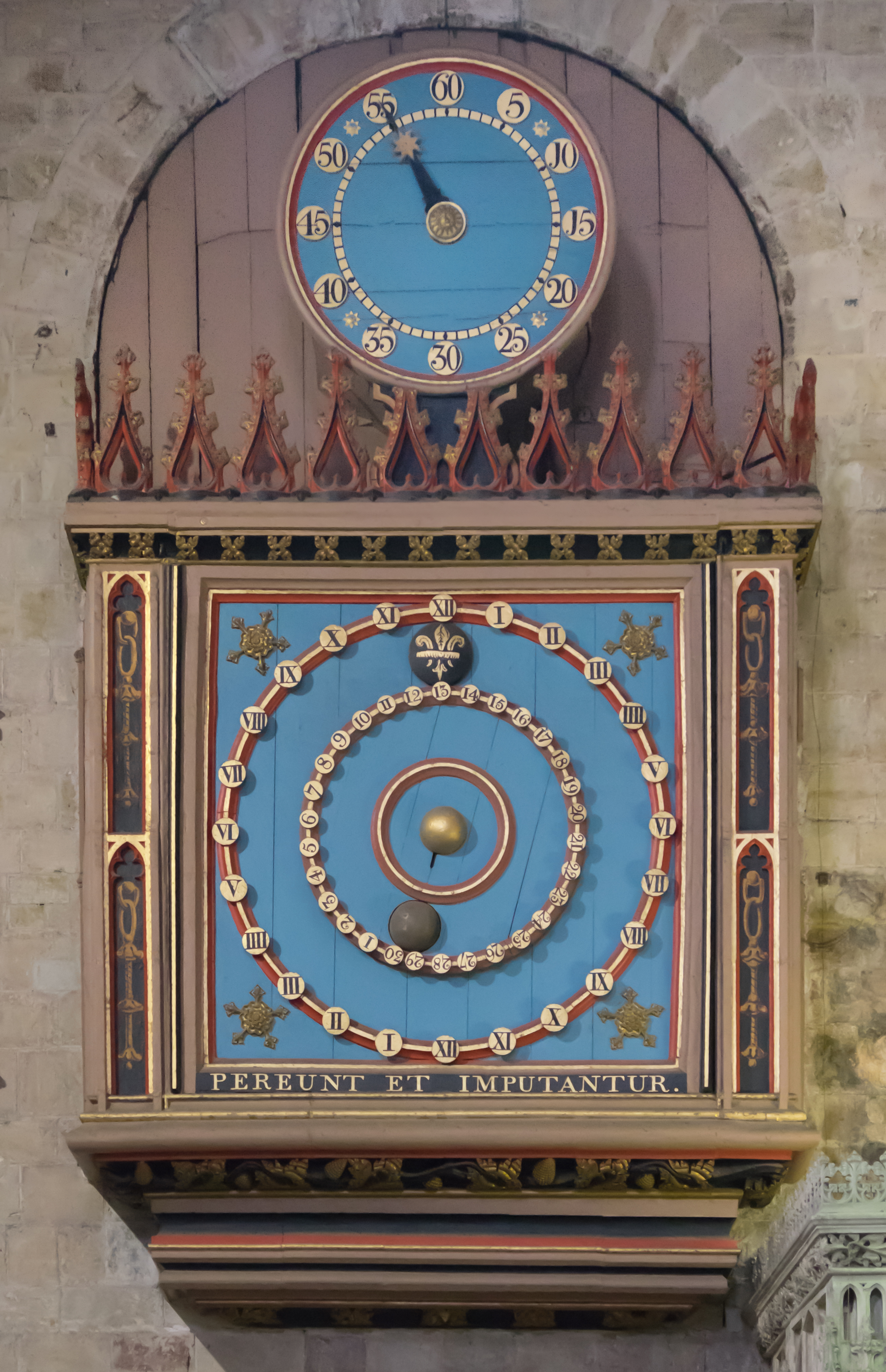
Exeter Cathedral Astronomical Clock, showing the double-XII numbering scheme

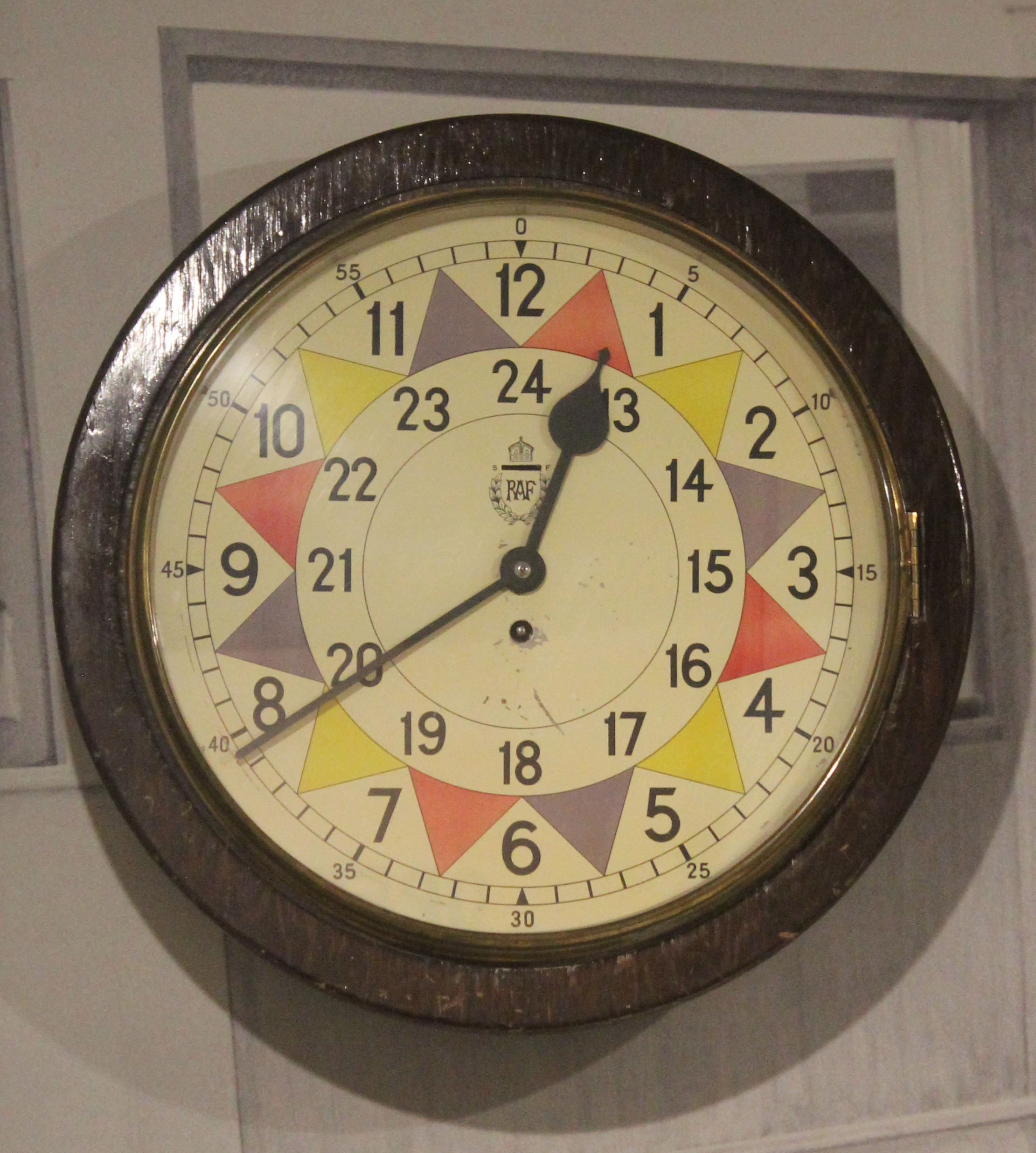
World War II RAF sector clock that can be read either in 12- or 24-hour notation

The natural day-and-night division of a calendar day forms the fundamental basis as to why each day is split into two cycles. Originally there were two cycles: one cycle which could be tracked by the position of the Sun (day), followed by one cycle which could be tracked by the Moon and stars (night). This eventually evolved into the two 12-hour periods which are used today, one called "a.m." starting at midnight and another called "p.m." starting at noon.

The 12-hour clock can be traced back as far as Mesopotamia and ancient Egypt. Both an Egyptian sundial for daytime use and an Egyptian water clock for night-time use were found in the tomb of Pharaoh Amenhotep I. Dating to c. 1500 BC, these clocks divided their respective times of use into 12 hours each.

The ancient Romans also used a 12-hour clock: daylight and nighttime were each divided into 12 equal intervals (of varying duration according to the season). The nighttime hours were grouped into four watches (vigiliae).

The first mechanical clocks in the 14th century, if they had dials at all, showed all 24 hours using the 24-hour analog dial, influenced by astronomers' familiarity with the astrolabe and sundial and by their desire to model the Earth's apparent motion around the Sun. In Northern Europe these dials generally used the 12-hour numbering scheme in Roman numerals but showed both a.m. and p.m. periods in sequence. This is known as the double-XII system and can be seen on many surviving clock faces, such as those at Wells and Exeter.

Elsewhere in Europe, numbering was more likely to be based on the 24-hour system (I to XXIV). The 12-hour clock was used throughout the British Empire.

During the 15th and 16th centuries, the 12-hour analog dial and time system gradually became established as standard throughout Northern Europe for general public use. The 24-hour analog dial was reserved for more specialized applications, such as astronomical clocks and chronometers.

Most analog clocks and watches today use the 12-hour dial, on which the shorter hour hand rotates once every 12 hours and twice in one day. Some analog clock dials have an inner ring of numbers along with the standard 1-to-12 numbered ring. The number 12 is paired either with a 00 or a 24, while the numbers 1 through 11 are paired with the numbers 13 through 23, respectively. This modification allows the clock to also be read in 24-hour notation. This kind of 12-hour clock can be found in countries where the 24-hour clock is preferred.

=== Use by country ===
World map showing the usage of 12 or 24-hour clock in different countries 24-hour written Both written by different groups 12-hour written (except in special circumstances such as aviation)

In several countries the 12-hour clock is the dominant written and spoken system of time, predominantly in nations that were part of the former British Empire, for example, the United Kingdom, Republic of Ireland, the United States, Canada (excluding Quebec), Australia, New Zealand, South Africa, India, Pakistan, and Bangladesh, and others follow this convention as well, such as Mexico, Colombia, and the former American colony of the Philippines. Even in those countries where the 12-hour clock is predominant, there are frequently contexts (such as science, medicine, the military or transport) in which the 24-hour clock is preferred. In most countries, however, the 24-hour clock is the standard system used, especially in writing. Some nations in Europe and Latin America use a combination of the two, preferring the 12-hour system in colloquial speech but using the 24-hour system in written form and in formal contexts.

The 12-hour clock in speech often uses phrases such as ... in the morning, ... in the afternoon, ... in the evening, and ... at night. Rider's British Merlin almanac for 1795 and a similar almanac for 1773 published in London used them. Other than in English-speaking countries and some Spanish-speaking countries, the terms a.m. and p.m. are seldom used and often unknown. (Note: The equivalents in Greek are π.μ. and μ.μ., respectively, and in Sinhala පෙ.ව. (pe.va.) for පෙරවරු (peravaru, පෙර pera – fore, pre) and ප.ව. (pa.va.) for පස්වරු (pasvaru, පස්සේ passē – after, post). In Irish, a.m. and i.n. are used, standing for ar maidin ("in the morning") and iarnóin ("afternoon") respectively. In Portuguese, there are two official options and many others used, for example, using 21:45, 21h45 or 21h45min (official ones) or 21:45 or 9:45 p.m. Most other languages lack formal abbreviations for "before noon" and "after noon", and their users use the 12-hour clock only orally and informally. In those languages, such as Polish, Russian, and Hebrew, 24-hour clock is always used in writing, even informal writing, though 12-hour designations may be used colloquially in speech, such as "9 in the morning" or "3 in the night". In those languages, an email saying "let's meet at 15:00" might be read out aloud as "let's meet at three in the afternoon".)

=== Computer support ===
In most countries, computers by default show the time in 24-hour notation. Most operating systems, including Microsoft Windows and Unix-like systems such as Linux and macOS, activate the 12-hour notation by default for a limited number of language and region settings. This behaviour can be changed by the user, such as with the Windows operating system's "Region and Language" settings.

== Abbreviations ==
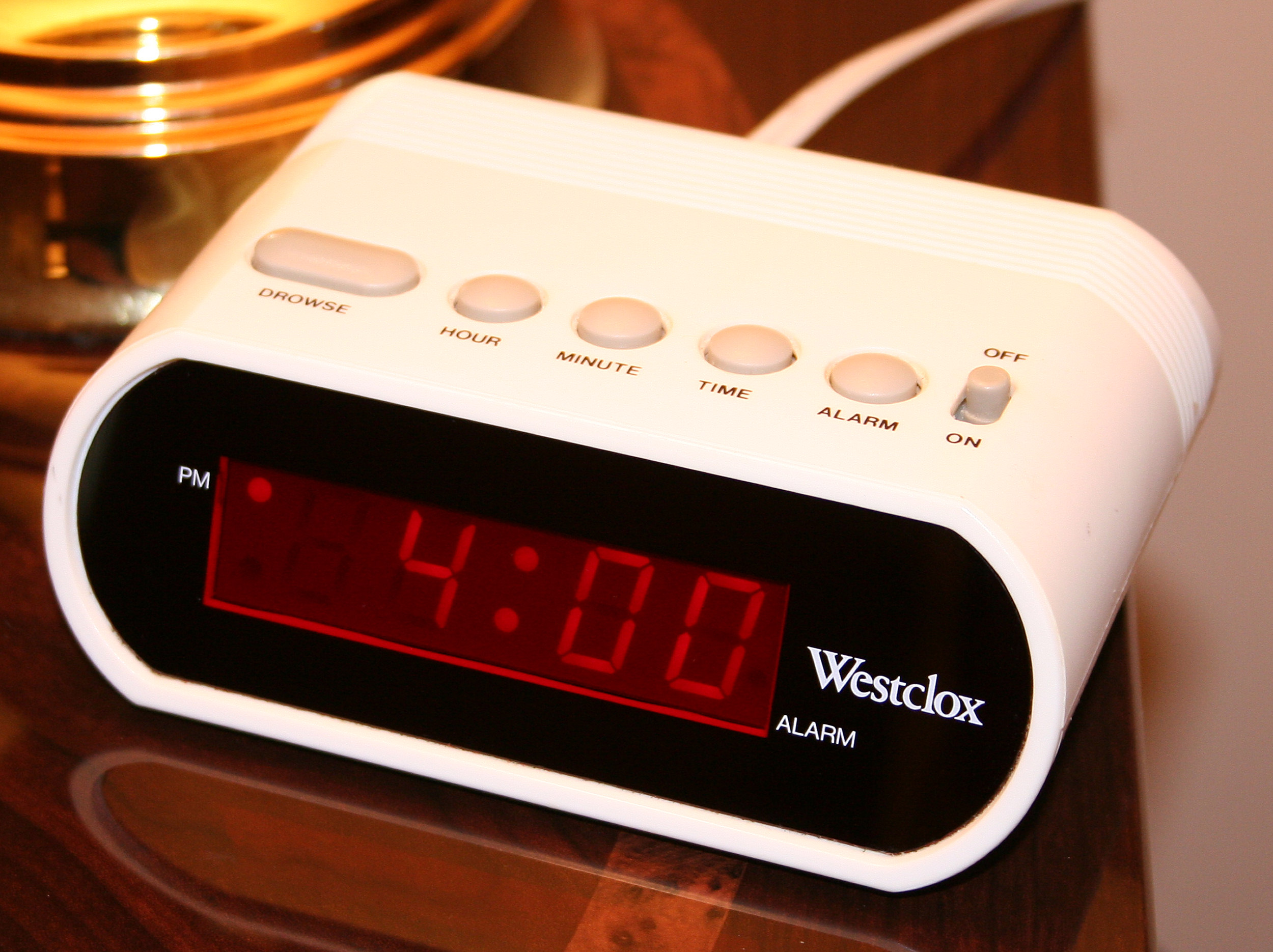
Typical digital 12-hour alarm clock indicating p.m. with a dot to the left of the hour.

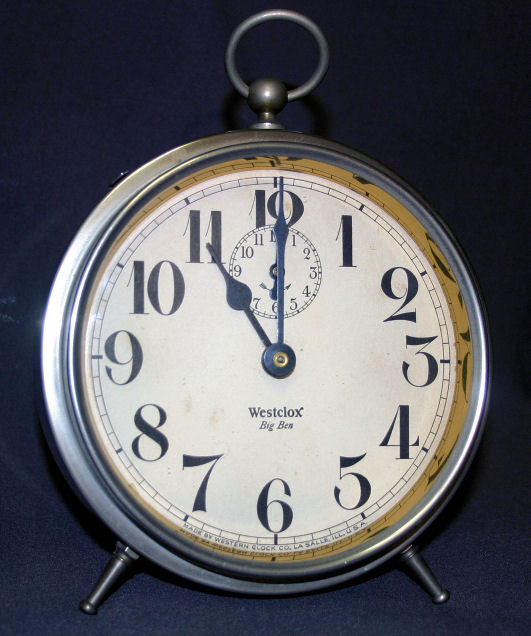
Typical analogue 12-hour clock

The Latin abbreviations a.m. and p.m. (often written "am" and "pm", "AM" and "PM", or "A.M." and "P.M.") are used in English (and Spanish). 'Noon' is not abbreviated.

When abbreviations and phrases are omitted, one may rely on sentence context and societal norms to reduce ambiguity. For example, if one commutes to work at "9:00", 9:00 a.m. may be implied, but if a social dance is scheduled to begin at "9:00", it may begin at 9:00 p.m.

== Related conventions ==
=== Typography ===
The terms "a.m." and "p.m." are abbreviations of the Latin ante meridiem (before midday) and post meridiem (after midday). Depending on the style guide referenced, the abbreviations "a.m." and "p.m." are variously written in small capitals ("am" and "pm"), uppercase letters without a period ("AM" and "PM"), uppercase letters with periods, or lowercase letters ("am" and "pm" or "a.m." and "p.m.").

Some style guides suggest the use of a space between the number and the a.m. or p.m. abbreviation. Style guides recommend not using a.m. and p.m. without a time preceding it.

The hour/minute separator varies between countries: some use a colon, others use a period (full stop), and still others use the letter h. (In some usages, particularly "military time", of the 24-hour clock, there is no separator between hours and minutes. This style is not generally seen when the 12-hour clock is used.)

=== Encoding ===
Unicode specifies codepoints for a.m. and p.m. as precomposed characters, which are intended to be used only with Chinese-Japanese-Korean (CJK) character sets, as they take up exactly the same space as one CJK character:

- U+33C2 ㏂ SQUARE AM
- U+33D8 ㏘ SQUARE PM

=== Informal speech and rounding off ===
In speaking, it is common to round the time to the nearest five minutes and/or express the time as the past (or to) the closest hour; for example, "five past five" (5:05). Minutes past the hour means those minutes are added to the hour; "ten past five" means 5:10. Minutes to, till and of the hour mean those minutes are subtracted; "ten of five", "ten till five", and "ten to five" all mean 4:50.

Fifteen minutes is often called a quarter hour, and thirty minutes is often known as a half hour. For example, 5:15 can be phrased "(a) quarter past five" or "five-fifteen"; 5:30 can be "half past five", "five-thirty" or simply "half five". The time 8:45 may be spoken as "eight forty-five" or "(a) quarter to nine". In some languages, e.g. Polish, rounding off is mandatory when using (spoken) 12-hour clock, but disallowed when using 24 hour notation. I.e. 15:12 might be pronounced as "quarter past three" or "fifteen-twelve", but not "three-twelve" or "quarter past fifteen".

In older English, it was common for the number 25 to be expressed as "five-and-twenty". In this way the time 8:35 might have been phrased as "five-and-twenty to 9", although this styling fell out of fashion in the later part of the 1900s and is now rarely used.

Instead of meaning 5:30, the "half five" expression is sometimes used to mean 4:30, or "halfway to five", especially for regions such as the American Midwest and other areas that have been particularly influenced by German culture. This meaning follows the pattern choices of many Germanic and Slavic languages, including Serbo-Croatian, Dutch, Danish, Russian, Norwegian, and Swedish, as well as Hungarian, Finnish, and the languages of the Baltic States.

Moreover, in situations where the relevant hour is obvious or has been recently mentioned, a speaker might omit the hour and just say "quarter to (the hour)", "half past" or "ten till" to avoid an elaborate sentence in informal conversations. These forms are often commonly used in television and radio broadcasts that cover multiple time zones at one-hour intervals.

=== Formal speech and times to the minute ===
Minutes may be expressed as an exact number of minutes past the hour specifying the time of day (e.g., 6:32 p.m. is "six thirty-two"). Additionally, when expressing the time using the "past (after)" or "to (before)" formula, it is conventional to choose the number of minutes below 30 (e.g., 6:32 p.m. is conventionally "twenty-eight minutes to seven" rather than "thirty-two minutes past six").

In spoken English, full hours are often represented by the numbered hour followed by o'clock (10:00 as ten o'clock, 2:00 as two o'clock). This may be followed by the "a.m." or "p.m." designator, though some phrases such as in the morning, in the afternoon, in the evening, or at night more commonly follow analog-style terms such as o'clock, half past three, and quarter to four. O'clock itself may be omitted, telling a time as four a.m. or four p.m. Minutes ":01" to ":09" are usually pronounced as oh one to oh nine (nought or zero can also be used instead of oh). Minutes ":10" to ":59" are pronounced as their usual number-words. For instance, 6:02 a.m. can be pronounced six oh two a.m. whereas 6:32 a.m. could be told as six thirty-two a.m..

== Confusion at noon and midnight ==
Time according to various conventions
| Device or style | Midnight Start of day | Noon | Midnight End of day |
|---|---|---|---|
| Written 24-hour time | 00:00 | 12:00 | 24:00 or 00:00 of following day |
| U.S. Government Publishing Office (1953) | 12 p.m. (Note: These styles are ambiguous with respect to whether midnight is at the start or end of each day.) | 12 m. | 12 p.m. |
| U.S. Government Publishing Office (2000) | 12 p.m. | 12 a.m. | 12 p.m. |
| U.S. Government Publishing Office (2008) | 12 a.m. | 12 p.m. | 12 a.m. |
| Japanese legal convention | 午前0時 (0 a.m.) | 午前12時 (12 a.m.) | 午後12時 (12 p.m.) |
| Japanese common usage | 午前0時 (0 a.m.) | 午後0時 (0 p.m.) | 午後12時 (12 p.m.) |
| Canadian Press, UK standard | midnight | noon | midnight |
| Associated Press style | — | noon | midnight |
| NIST | midnight (Note: NIST recommends using 11:59 p.m. and 12:01 a.m. to disambiguate when needed.); 12:01 a.m. | noon | midnight 11:59 p.m. |

It is not always clear what times "12:00 a.m." and "12:00 p.m." denote. In Latin, ante meridiem (a.m.) means "before midday" and post meridiem (p.m.) means "after midday". Since noon is neither before nor after itself, the terms a.m. and p.m. do not apply. Although noon could be denoted "12 m.", this is seldom done and also does not resolve the question of how to indicate midnight.

By convention, "12 a.m." denotes midnight and "12 p.m." denotes noon. However, many style guides recommend against using either because of the potential for confusion. Many recommend instead using the unambiguous terms "12 noon" and "12 midnight", or simply "noon" and "midnight". These include The American Heritage Dictionary of the English Language, The Canadian Press Stylebook, and the NIST's "Frequently asked questions (FAQ)" web page.

Alternatively, some recommend referring to one minute before or after 12:00, especially when referring to midnight (for example, "11:59 p.m." or "12:01 a.m."). These include the UK's National Physical Laboratory "FAQ-Time" web page. That has become common in the United States in legal contracts and for airplane, bus, or train schedules, though some schedules use other conventions. Occasionally, when trains run at regular intervals, the pattern may be broken at midnight by displacing the midnight departure one or more minutes, such as to 11:59 p.m. or 12:01 a.m.

Some authors have been known to use the reverse of the normal convention. E. G. Richards in his book Mapping Time (1999) provided a diagram in which 12 a.m. means noon and 12 p.m. means midnight. Historically, the style manual of the United States Government Printing Office used 12 a.m. for noon and 12 p.m. for midnight, though this was reversed in its 2008 editions.

== See also ==
- 24-hour clock – Timekeeping convention
- Canonical hours – Christian concept of periods of prayer throughout the day
- Clock position – Relative direction using a dial
- Date and time representation by country
- Decimal time – Time of day using decimal units
- Italian six-hour clock – Historic timekeeping system
- Midnight – Transition time from one day to the next
- Muhurta – Time of the day as benefic or malefic
- Noon – 12 o'clock in the daytime
- Pahar – Unit of time used in Indian subcontinent
- Thai six-hour clock – Thai timekeeping system
