= Time in Ethiopia =

Time in Africa: Light Blue / Cape Verde Time^{[a]} (UTC−1); Blue / Greenwich Mean Time (UTC); Red / Central European Time; West Africa Time; (UTC+1); Yellow / Central Africa Time; Eastern European Time; South African Standard Time; (UTC+2); Ochre / Egypt Standard Time (UTC+2); Ochre / Egypt Summer Time (UTC+3); Green / East Africa Time (UTC+3); Turquoise / Mauritius Time^{[b]}; Seychelles Time^{[b]}; (UTC+4)^{a} The islands of Cape Verde are west of the African mainland.^{b} Mauritius and the Seychelles are east and northeast of Madagascar, respectively.

The time zone in Ethiopia is East Africa Time (EAT) (UTC+03:00). The IANA time zone database identifier is Africa/Addis_Ababa.

Ethiopia does not observe daylight saving time.

== Date and time notation ==
Almost all Ethiopians use a modified 12-hour clock system. The daytime cycle begins at dawn 12:00 (6:00:00 AM EAT) and ends at dusk 11:59:59 (5:59:59 PM EAT). The nighttime cycle begins at dusk 12:00 (6:00:00 PM EAT) and ends at dawn at 11:59:59 (5:59:59 AM EAT). The convention is that the day begins at 1:00 o'clock in the morning according to the 12-hour cycle (7:00 AM EAT) rather than midnight (12:00 AM EAT). As of 2015, the modified 12-hour system remained common, despite pressure to follow international norms.
In practice one can subtract 6 hours from EAT to get the Ethiopian one. Or reverse: one can add 6 hours to Ethiopian time to get the EAT. The Arabic version of this article uses this expression: “local residents effectively observe UTC−03:00”.

== See also ==
- Thai six-hour clock
- Roman timekeeping – Hour system with days divided into 24 hours
- Byzantine time – 0:00:00 begins daily at sunset rather than midnight
- Relative hour – Hebrew term ascribed to an hour of a 12-hour day and how it is to be reckoned

== External links 12 hours only ==
- Time in Ethiopia - Current Time Date in Ethiopia
- Time in Ethiopia - Local and International
