= 2020 Maricopa County wildfires =

Natural disasters in Arizona, USA

- Part of the 2020 Arizona wildfires
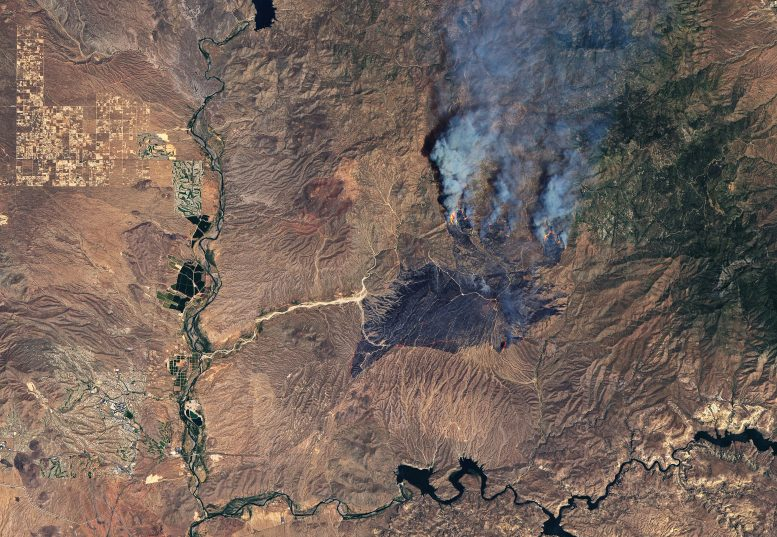
- Satellite view of the Bush Fire on June 14, 2020.
- Date: May 17 – October 11, 2020

Statistics
- Total area: 200,000+ acres (80,937 ha)

Impacts
- Deaths: 0
- Injuries: 0
- Structures lost: 44
- Cost: $17,000,000+ (2020 USD)

Map
Major wildfires (Map)

The 2020 Maricopa County wildfires were a series of major and non-major wildfires that took place in Maricopa County, Arizona, from the month of May to the month of October. In the year 2020, Arizona saw one of its worst fire seasons in the states history. Due to the lack of precipitation needed in Arizona, the state fell into an ongoing drought from late 2020 and 2021. High winds were also present during the summer when fire season is mostly active in the state. These factors led to the wildfires in Maricopa County to be destructive and costly.

Out of all the counties in Arizona, 200,000+ acres (80,937 ha) burned in Maricopa County alone, which is almost 20% of the acreage burned in Arizona in 2020. The wildfires in the county of Maricopa destroyed approximately 44 structures and there were no reported deaths or injuries. In addition, the Bush Fire would become one of the worst wildfires to ever scorch parts of Maricopa County since the Cave Creek Complex Fire in the summer of 2005.

== Background ==
The wildfire season in the U.S. state of Arizona usually begins in the month of May and ends in the month of July due to the North American Monsoon, which brings enough rainfall to prevent any major wildfires that could happen in the future without any precipitation. But in the year 2020, this year's monsoon season was the driest on record in Arizona history. The average rainfall in the 2020 Arizona monsoon season was 1.51 inches across the state. Because of the unusual amount of rainfall Arizona obtained, this led them to a drought which has not just affected Arizona, but most of the Western United States. In the city of Phoenix, Arizona, they got approximately 0.46 inches of rain during the monsoon season, which gives wildfires the advantage to spread quickly due to dry fuel. These components of having the absence of rainfall, high winds, and drought led the way for 2020 being one of Arizona's worst fire seasons ever recorded.

=== COVID-19 pandemic ===
During the fight to contain wildfires in Maricopa County, there was also another obstacle that would make wildland firefighting even more difficult, the COVID-19 pandemic. At the time during the months of June and July, Arizona was experiencing a huge spike in coronavirus cases, which made the job of wildland firefighting difficult because of firefighters having to go into quarantine due to a suspected case of the disease. Maricopa County had the most confirmed coronavirus cases since it was the most populous county in the state of Arizona. Wildfire smoke also increased the risk for firefighters to get COVID-19.

== Wildfires ==
The following is a list of fires that burned more than 1,000 acres (400 ha), or produced significant structural damage or casualties.

Name	Acres	Start date	Containment date	Notes	Ref
East Desert	1,492	May 17	May 22	Human-caused; fire sparked north of Cave Creek Regional Park	
Jackrabbit	2,034	May 25	May 27	Human-caused; fire sparked southwest of Wickenburg	
Ocotillo	980	May 30	June 2	Human-caused; due to gusty winds, the fire spread quickly into the town of Cave Creek. 20 structures were destroyed.	
Bush	193,455	June 13	July 6	Human-caused; the Bush Fire sparked 22 miles northeast of Mesa. Evacuations were ordered for communities near the blaze. Fuels that were burned in the wildfire were tall grass and brush. Days later, the Bush Fire would become the 5th largest wildfire in Arizona history.	
Central	4,517	June 20	June 30	Human-caused; the Central Fire affected air quality in certain parts of Phoenix.	
Aquila	893	June 23	June 26	Human-caused; the fire destroyed 6 structures north of Phoenix	
Painted Wagon	490	June 25	June 27	Human-caused; the fire destroyed 5 structures 20 miles west of Wittmann	
Buren	2,800	July 11	July 14	Human-caused	
Goldfield	1,970	August 10	August 12	Human-caused; the fire burned east of Fort McDowell	
Rolls	1,350	August 18	August 24	Lightning-sparked; the fire burned in the Tonto National Forest	
Bolt	1,420	August 28	September 4	Lightning-sparked; the fire burned near Cave Creek	
Sears	14,476	September 25	October 11	Cause is unknown; the Sears Fire burns and destroys 13 structures near Bartlett Lake	

=== Bush Fire ===
Bush Fire
- Progression of the Bush Fire.

Statistics
- Burned area: 193,455 acres (78,288 ha)

Impacts
- Structures lost: 0
- Cost: $11,642,634 (2020 USD)

The fire started around 2:00 p.m. (MST) on June 13 near Bush Highway and Highway 87 where they both intersect. The fire sparked from a vehicle fire on the intersection. By June 16, the fire had already grown to more than 64,513 acres (26,100 ha) due to gusty winds and low humidity and was 0% contained. Later on that day, the Maricopa County Sheriff's Office issued an evacuation order for residents living near the Apache Lake area. At the time, it was the largest wildfire burning in the United States. Forecast across Arizona throughout the week showed humidity below 10% in Phoenix, with gusty winds reaching over 20 mph. On June 17, due to dry brush and high winds, the wildfire doubled in size with an additional 20,000+ acres burned, putting the total acres burned by the Bush Fire at 89,059 acres (36,041 ha). Road closures were put in effect for State Route 87 and State Route 188. Evacuation centers were opened to evacuees from the American Red Cross in Tucson, Payson, and Miami. On June 18, the fire had reached 104,379 acres, surpassing the size of the city of Mesa 22 miles away. Evacuations were still in place for the areas of Apache Lake, Sunflower, and Punkin Center. Containment status of the blaze was still out of control and at 5% containment. Earlier on that day by 2:00 a.m., the fire had already reached near Highway 188. During the spike in coronavirus cases in June, many people were arriving at evacuation centers due to the Bush Fire, so to prevent any mass infections to take place in the evacuation centers, people would be required to stay 6-feet away from each other and wear masks.

The following weeks went on with firefighters making progress on the east side of the Bush Fire along Highway 188. By June 19, the Bush Fire had already scorched 184,086 acres (74,497 ha). Winds did begin to moderate at about 5-10 mph, which allowed firefighters to have a good advancement against the immense blaze. The only poor factor into fighting the wildfire was high temperatures, which reached over 100 °F (37.78 °C). On June 23, the Bush Fire was at 61% containment with the help of calm winds and 587 total resources used including 30 engines, 3 bulldozers, 8 helicopters, and 18 water tenders. Later that day on June 23, residents who evacuated from Apache Lake and Sunflower were allowed to go back home. Evacuation status was still in "Set" just in case if weather throughout the week gives wildfires across the state an advantage to spread quickly.

At 3:15 p.m. on June 26, the Tonto National Forest gave an update on Twitter that the Bush Fire had burned 190,269 acres (76,999 ha) and was at 90% containment. People received news about high winds moving into the area where the fire is burning. Due to the strong winds, a red flag warning was issued for portions of Maricopa County, including where the Bush Fire was burning. Residents around the blaze were told to expect hazy skies caused by smoke throughout the weekend. On June 28, the massive fire spread to 193,455 acres (78,288 ha) and increased in containment by 8%. Many days passed by with the wildfire still being at 98% containment, but finally on July 6, the wildfire reached 100% containment with 193,455 acres (78,288 ha) burned. Fortunately no injuries or deaths were reported and no structures were destroyed in the fire's path. Over 400 fire personnel responded to the inferno in the Tonto National Forest, where most the flames were most present. The Bush Fire would become and still is the 5th largest wildfire in Arizona history, surpassing the Woodbury Fire which burned northwest of Superior in 2019.

=== Central Fire ===
Central Fire
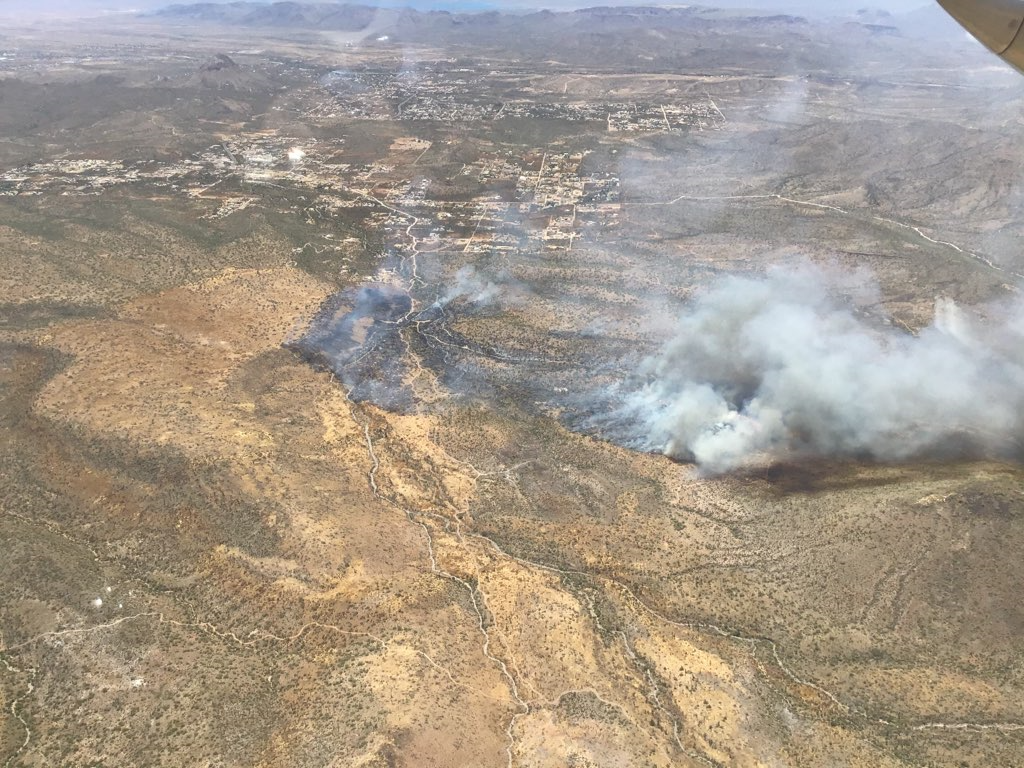
- The Central Fire burning near homes on June 21, 2020.

Statistics
- Burned area: 4,499 acres (1,821 ha)

Impacts
- Structures lost: 0
- Cost: $1,960,522 (2020 USD)

The fire started around 11:00 a.m. (MST) on June 20, 4 miles northeast of New River and quickly spread into the Tonto National Forest on same day it was first reported. In 24 hours, the fire had already grown to 3,956 acres (1,601 ha) caused by hot temperatures, strong winds, and dry fuel. The fire eventually enlarged and expanded along the Top River Mesa. Multiple agencies quickly responded to the fast-moving inferno which was still moving northeast. They had also called air tankers since the fire was moving quickly due to strong winds and dry brush. By midnight on June 22, the fire had scorched 4,517 acres (1,828 ha). In the evening on the same day, it was announced that the fire was human-caused, but no specific cause was said.

By June 26, the fire had reached 80% containment and Burned Area Emergency Response assessments were conducted. During the blaze, the smoke had an effect on Phoenix's air quality, mostly in the eastern portions of the city. On June 30, the fire had finally reached 100% containment. No injuries or deaths were reported and no structures were damaged or destroyed.

=== Ocotillo Fire ===
Ocotillo Fire

Statistics
- Burned area: 980 acres (400 ha)

Impacts
- Structures lost: 20
- Cost: $1,200,000 (2020 USD)

On May 30, at around 1:00 p.m., a fire sparked and broke out near Ocotillo Road a mile away from Cave Creek. Residents of Cave Creek expected hot temperatures and high winds in the forecast on May 30, not knowing that they would have to be forced to evacuate from their homes later on due to the fast-moving Ocotillo Fire. 2–3 hours later, over 500 residents of Cave Creek were ordered to evacuate immediately. Winds fueled the fire and eventually the blaze went on to scorch 20 structures, including 8 homes in Cave Creek. By then, the blaze had already grown to over 100 acres (40 ha) and was still 0% contained. Evacuation orders still remained in place. On May 31, the inferno had scorched 980 acres (400 ha) and was 10% contained. An evacuation shelter was set up from the Red Cross at Cactus Shadows High School. On June 1, progress was made on the raging wildfire with the blaze reaching 67% containment and still steady on 980 acres burned. On the same day, it was said that evacuation orders will be lifted on June 2.

On the same day where evacuations were lifted, the Ocotillo Fire had finally reached 100% containment and the total acreage burned was 980 acres. Residents going back home were told to be careful because of engines patrolling throughout the burn scar monitoring for hot spots. As a result, the Ocotillo Fire burned 20 structures, including 8 homes. Fortunately, there were no injuries or deaths reported. Over 200 firefighters battled the blaze. More than 500 homes with 1,000 residents had to be evacuated. The wildfire was human-caused, but the specific source of the human-caused fire was still under investigation.

=== Aquila Fire ===
Aquila Fire

Statistics
- Burned area: 899 acres (364 ha)

Impacts
- Structures lost: 6
- Cost: $750,000 (2020 USD)

The Aquila Fire started around 2:30 p.m. near Carefree Highway north Phoenix on June 23. The fast-moving wildfire made the Maricopa County Sheriff's Office force residents of 200 homes to evacuate. An evacuation center was set up nearby. Over 120 firefighters quickly responded to the immense wildfire. Due to dry vegetation, the Aquila Fire was able to spread into neighborhoods and destroy 6 structures in its path. More than 100 residents had to be evacuated and the fire was at 5% containment. Three days later, the Aquila was quickly "under control" and was 100% contained. As a result, a total of 6 structures were destroyed and no injuries or deaths were reported.

=== Painted Wagon Fire ===
Painted Wagon Fire

Statistics
- Burned area: 490 acres (200 ha)

Impacts
- Structures lost: 5
- Cost: Unknown

The Painted Wagon Fire started on June 25 near the Painted Wagon Trail and was 20 miles east of Wittman and quickly enlarged to 490 acres (200 ha) due to high winds and dry grass and brush. Residents who lived near the Painted Wagon Trail were evacuated and in the fire's path, the flames claimed 5 structures. The fire kept moving northeast towards more dry brush, which could make the wildfire even more immense and destructive and threaten even more communities. On June 26, residents were able to go back home and the evacuation status was still in "Set", but later changed to "Ready" status. On June 27, the Painted Wagon Fire was fully contained. The blaze claimed a total of 5 structures and no injuries or deaths were reported.

=== Sears Fire ===
Sears Fire
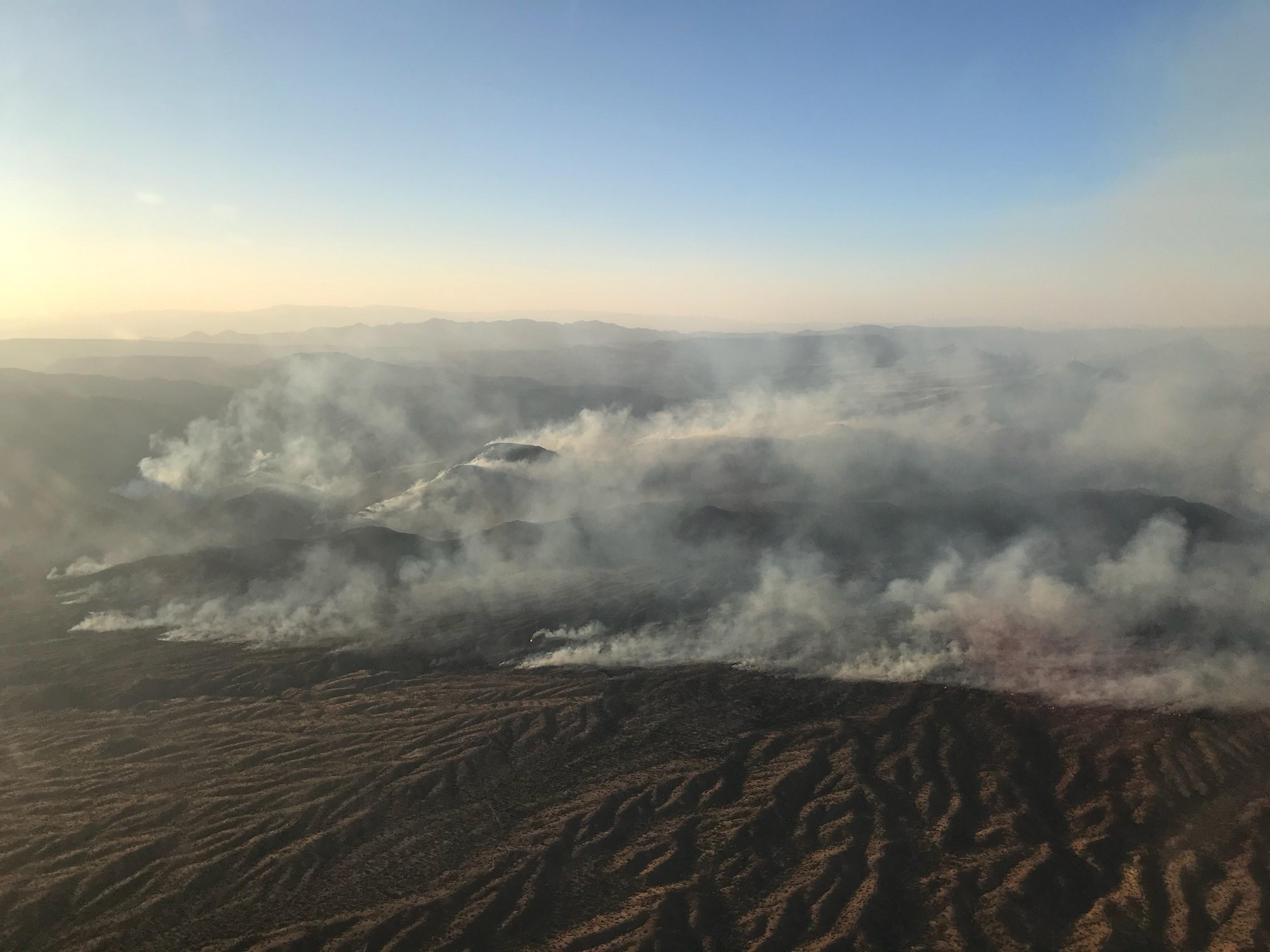
- The Sears Fire burning on September 25.

Statistics
- Burned area: 14,476 acres (5,858 ha)

Impacts
- Structures lost: 13
- Cost: $1,200,000 (2020 USD)

The Sears Fire started at approximately 2:45 p.m. on September 25 near the Sears Kay Ranch. Evacuations were announced for residents living near Bartlett Lake hours later. By then, the fire quickly spread into the Tonto National Forest. In 24 hours on September 26, the fire had already grown to 5,200 acres (2,100 ha) and temporary closures were put in for Bartlett Lake as a precaution. On September 27, the blaze grew an additional 3,500+ acres, making the acreage burned by the Sears Fire at 8,700 acres (3,500 ha). At around 1:30 p.m., because of powerful and strong winds, the fire grew to 9,200 acres (3,700 ha) with 0% containment. According to the Tonto National Forest, the fire had scorched and destroyed 8 structures and smoldered several vehicles. Air tankers and helicopters had entered in the fire zone and dropped several gallons of fire retardant to keep that fire at ease. By 11:00 a.m. on September 28, the blaze had rapidly grown to 12,474 acres (5,048 ha) and 5 more structures were destroyed. Later on that day, progress was made on the fire with containment on the blaze increasing by 15%, but the fire also increased in size with acreage burned at 14,241 acres (5,763 ha)

On October 2, the size of the Sears Fire increases with 14,476 acres (5,858 ha) burned and containment rises to 60%. A closure was still in effect throughout areas close to the Sears Fire. Days passed by with the fire still steady at 14,476 acres and still within the 60% containment mark. Residents of nearby communities were notified that they still may see smoke for a couple of days, due to the wildfire burning dry grass and brush inside the fire perimeter. Many roads are reopened to the public and residents of evacuated communities are allowed to go back home. Firefighters over the next several days would still monitor the Sears Fire for any change in direction of the wind and monitor any hotspots that might appear near the wildfire. Finally on October 11, the Sears Fire would extend to 100% containment. Thus, the Sears Fire approximately burned 14,476 acres of land and destroyed 13 structures in its path. No injuries or deaths were reported.

== Aftermath ==
Causes of the fire were mostly due to human activity, dry vegetation, high winds, and the lack of rain obtained during the monsoon season between July and September. Due to these causes, 2020 became Arizona's worst fire season. Most the acres burned in Maricopa County was caused by the Bush Fire. Over 1,000 people had to be evacuated from their properties due to the wildfires burning in the county. 200,000+ acres were scorched in the area and left noticeable burn scars around northern Maricopa County. Fortunately, no deaths or injuries were announced. Approximately 44 structures were destroyed and the cost of the wildfires reached well over $17 million (2020 USD).

== See also ==
- List of Arizona wildfires
- 2020 Arizona wildfires
- List of natural disasters in the United States
