= International date line in Judaism =

Change of day in the Jewish calendar

The international date line (Note: The convention used is to capitalize "Date Line" (or "International Date Line") when it refers to the standard International Date Line, but to use small letters to refer to possible construct(s) under Jewish law.) in Judaism is used to demarcate the change of one calendar day to the next in the Jewish calendar. It is not necessarily the same as the internationally recognised International Date Line (IDL - which is 180° from the Greenwich Meridian, passing through London, UK). On the east side of the IDL it is one day, on the west side it is the next.

However, the conventional International Date Line is a relatively recent geographic and political construct whose exact location has moved from time to time depending on the needs of different interested parties. While it is well-understood why the conventional date line is located in the Pacific Ocean, there are not really objective criteria for its exact placement within the Pacific. In that light, it cannot be taken for granted that the conventional International Date Line can (or should) be used as a date line under Jewish law. In practice, within Judaism the halakhic date line is similar to, but not necessarily identical with, the conventional Date Line, and the differences can have consequences under religious law.

== Location of the date line ==
=== Theoretical basis for the discussion ===
Many of the opinions about the halakhic date line are structured as a response to the question of what days someone should observe as Shabbat and Jewish holidays. Shabbat occurs every seven days at any location on Earth. It is normally thought to occur on Saturday—or more precisely, from Friday at sundown to Saturday at nightfall. But if the halakhic date line is not identical to the conventional Date Line, it is possible that what is Saturday with respect to the conventional Date Line is not Saturday with respect to the halakhic date line, at least in some places.

There are several opinions regarding where exactly the halakhic date line should be according to Jewish law, and at least one opinion that says that no halakhic date line really exists.

1. 90 degrees east of Jerusalem. The concept of a halakhic date line is mentioned in the Baal HaMeor, a 12th-century Talmudic commentary, which seems to indicate that the day changes in an area where the time is six hours ahead of Jerusalem (90 degrees east of Jerusalem, about 125.2°E, a line now known to run through Australia, the Philippines, China and Russia). This line, which he refers to as the K'tzai Hamizrach (the easternmost line), is used to calculate the day of Rosh Hashanah, the Jewish New Year. According to some sources it is alluded to in both the Babylonian Talmud (Rosh Hashanah and Eruvin) and in the Jerusalem Talmud. The Kuzari of Yehuda Halevi, also a 12th-century work, seems to agree with this ruling.

Later decisors like the Chazon Ish (twentieth century) fundamentally agree with this ruling. However, they recognize practical issues associated with the pure use of a line of longitude for this purpose. As an example, 125.2°E passes directly through Dongfeng Street in Changchun, China. If this line of longitude were used strictly, people could simply avoid Shabbat altogether by crossing the street. To prevent that, the Chazon Ish rules (Note: Cited in Taplin at footnote 16 of the web page.) that the contiguous land masses to the east of that line of longitude are considered secondary (tafel) to the land masses west of that line. As a result, he rules that the date line runs along 125.2°E when over water, but curves around the eastern coast of mainland Asia and Australia. By this view, Russia, China and mainland Australia are west of the date line and observe Shabbat on local Saturday. Japan, New Zealand and Tasmania are east of the date line and should observe Shabbat on local Sunday, as defined by the conventional International Date Line. By this view, the Philippines and Indonesia would have portions west of the line and portions east of the line.

2. 180 degrees east of Jerusalem. Rabbi Yechiel Michel Tucazinsky ruled that the International Date Line is 180 degrees east of Jerusalem. That would mean that the date line, rather than being near 180°, would be at 144.8°W. By this view, places east of the conventional International Date Line but west of 144.8°W—Alaska, Hawaii and a variety of archipelagos in the Pacific—would observe Shabbat on the local Friday instead of the local Saturday.

It is possible (but not certain) under this view to apply the principle of tafel described above as well. In that event, mainland Alaska would be east of the date line, but the Aleutian Islands would be west of the date line.

3. Mid-Pacific. A variety of decisors (Note: Inter alia, Rabbis David Shapira, B. Rabinowitz Thumim, the Atzei Sodeh, and the Alai Yonah. These decisors do not necessarily rule identically to each other.) rule that the date line runs in the middle of the Pacific Ocean, close to (but not necessarily the same as) the conventional International Date Line. According to this point of view, all of the major populated areas of the Pacific (such as New Zealand, Japan, Alaska and Hawaii) observe Shabbat on local Saturday (that is, consistent with the conventional International Date Line). Only certain Pacific islands, generally having few or no permanent Jewish residents, might not observe Shabbat on local Saturday.

4. Following local custom/There is no fixed date line. According to Rabbi Menachem Mendel Kasher, there is no clear tradition or Talmudic source dictating any of the preceding opinions as binding. For that reason, and consistent with a responsum of the Radbaz, Rabbi Kasher starts with the default law that a Jew not knowing the proper day for Shabbat should count days from the last time s/he observed Shabbat, and that every seven days is Shabbat. In his view, established Jewish communities are presumed to have fixed their calendars according to this principle. Therefore, Shabbat in an established community is whatever day the community has established. Rabbi Isser Zalman Meltzer and Rabbi Zvi Pesach Frank apparently agree with this position. This position does not in and of itself require a formal date line to be established, and Rabbi Kasher does not seem to think that it is necessary to do so. But the de facto result of this position is consistent with the conventional International Date Line, at least anywhere there is an established Jewish community. (Note: Rabbi Shurpin and Gewirtz provide treatments as to how changes in the location of the International Date Line might affect its use as a de facto standard in Jewish Law.)

=== Practical rulings ===
In practice, the conventional International Date Line (or another mid-Pacific line near it) is the de facto date line under Jewish law, at least for established Jewish communities. The communities of Japan, New Zealand, Hawaii, and French Polynesia all observe Shabbat on local Saturday (i.e., Friday night until Saturday night). No known Jewish community observes Shabbat on a day other than local Saturday. However there are those in Hawaii who celebrate Kabbalah Shabbat on a Thursday evening. However, that practical conclusion is reached in two different ways, resulting in somewhat different practice patterns in each case.

Following local custom/There is no fixed date line. As noted above, according to this point of view, Shabbat is simply observed on the date previously established as Shabbat by the local community—uniformly, local Saturday—without any need for any further observance. This appears to be the default practice for residents of such places as Japan, New Zealand and Hawaii. At minimum, it is difficult to find evidence of other practices by residents of those areas. (Note: Taken to a fully logical conclusion, no fixed date line means that anyone in a location without an established tradition of which day is Shabbat should always depend on his own personal count of days. It is not clear whether this can currently apply to someone traveling on his or her own to an island in the Western Pacific without an established tradition. (See, for example, Rabbi Shurpin at the end of the section "The Samoa issue".) However, it seems clear that at minimum one construes an "established community" relatively broadly. So while Japan, for example, has only a scattered handful of synagogues, their uniform practice of observing Shabbat on Saturday seems sufficient to fix Saturday as the established day for Shabbat anywhere in Japan.)

Establishment of a date line by a majority among three halakhic positions. The travelers' guide of the Star-K kosher supervision service, compiled according to the rulings of its rabbinic administrator, Rabbi Moshe Heinemann, uses the following approach, which is also cited by others. According to this approach, the first three numbered sections above constitute three valid, parallel, halakhic rulings. Shabbat is consequently fully observed on whichever day is consistent with the majority view among those opinions (two out of three). However, out of respect to the minority view of the third ruling, and with an eye toward not desecrating Shabbat, Torah-level prohibitions are to be avoided on the day consistent with the minority view, although that day is otherwise considered a weekday. According to this rule, practice is as follows:

- In New Zealand and Japan, the local Saturday is Shabbat according to the majority opinion (sections 2 and 3 above), and it should therefore be fully observed as Shabbat. However, since according to the minority opinion (section 1 above), Shabbat is on the local Sunday, one should not perform any Torah-level Shabbat prohibitions on Sunday. Nevertheless, on Sunday, one should pray the regular weekday prayers, donning tefillin during morning prayers.
- In Hawaii and French Polynesia, the local Saturday is Shabbat according to majority opinion (sections 1 and 3 above), and it should therefore be fully observed as Shabbat. However, since according to the minority opinion (section 2 above), Shabbat is on the local Friday, one should not perform any Torah-level Shabbat prohibitions on Friday. Friday prayers are weekday prayers, and preparation for Shabbat must be done with an eye to avoiding Torah-level Shabbat prohibitions.
- In principle, a zone of pure doubt exists in approximately the area of 169°W–177°E, including places like Tonga, Samoa and American Samoa. The rulings of the Mid-Pacific group above are not perfectly consistent in this area, so there is no possibility of an unambiguous "two out of three" consensus here. Rabbi Dovid Heber of the Star-K suggests that in such locations one might need to observe Shabbat fully for two days every week.

The Star-K's international kosher supervision staff follows this approach, and there is evidence that some other travelers also do. Authorities suggesting this approach often advise travelers to avoid the zone of doubt entirely near weekends, or to consult with a competent rabbinical authority directly.

== Crossing the halakhic date line ==
The issues discussed in the previous section apply per se to individuals or communities in fixed locations. However, the act of crossing the date line (wherever it may be drawn) introduces a number of additional issues under Jewish law. Questions potentially affected include:

- Crossing the line into or out of Shabbat or a holiday, or a rabbinic fast day, while already aboard an airplane or a ship
- Determining what prayers to say (and when) while in transit
- Lighting candles on Hanukkah
- Counting of the Omer, and consequently fixing the day for Shavuot
- Counting days until relations are permitted following menstruation
- Fixing the date for Brit Milah, Pidyon Haben or Bar and Bat Mitzvah

In some cases, crossing the date line (wherever it may be drawn) has a specific impact on practice or prohibitions under Jewish law. In others, an individual's count of days (by the experience of sunset and sunrise) is the determining factor, regardless of the crossing of the date line. Details around specific questions, cases and rulings of Jewish law are beyond the scope of this article. (Note: See Taplin, which covers these questions in some detail. The author notes that there are consensus opinions about some—but not all—of these issues.)

== Considerations for astronauts ==
Before Israeli astronaut Ilan Ramon flew on the Space Shuttle Columbia in 2003, he decided (after consultation with rabbis) to observe Shabbat according to time in his last residence, Cape Canaveral, since he would be crossing the date line and observing sunset many times per day. Judith Resnik, the first American Jewish astronaut in space, lit (electronic) Shabbat candles according to the time in Houston, TX, her home and the location of Mission Control.

== See also ==
- Jewish law in the polar regions
- Zmanim
