= Byzantine time =

0:00:00 begins daily at sunset rather than midnight

Byzantine time is the final Greek Anno Mundi method of keeping time that originated in the Byzantine Empire.

It is now rarely used in Europe save for in Eastern Orthodox monasteries, for example, on Mount Athos in Greece and Mar Saba monastery in the West Bank. However this way of keeping time remains common in East Africa. Ethiopia (where Oriental Orthodoxy is the largest religion of the country) uses this type of timing, as does Kenya, Tanzania and Somalia. In some countries clocks will continue to be set according to the official time zone of EAT (East Africa Time), but read as six hours earlier, while in others the clocks themselves are set to EAT -6.00.

In Byzantine time, hour 0:00:00 begins daily at sunset rather than midnight. Due to seasonal variations in the length of a day, particularly in non-equitorial regions, hour zero can vary by several hours throughout the year. The Byzantine calendar is a related method of keeping dates.

== See also ==
- Civil time
- Decimal time
- Roman timekeeping – Hour system with days divided into 24 hours
- Ottoman time also set the clocks at 12:00 at sunset.
- Relative hour – Hebrew term ascribed to an hour of a 12-hour day and how it is to be reckoned
