= 2020 Arizona wildfires =

Natural disasters in the USA

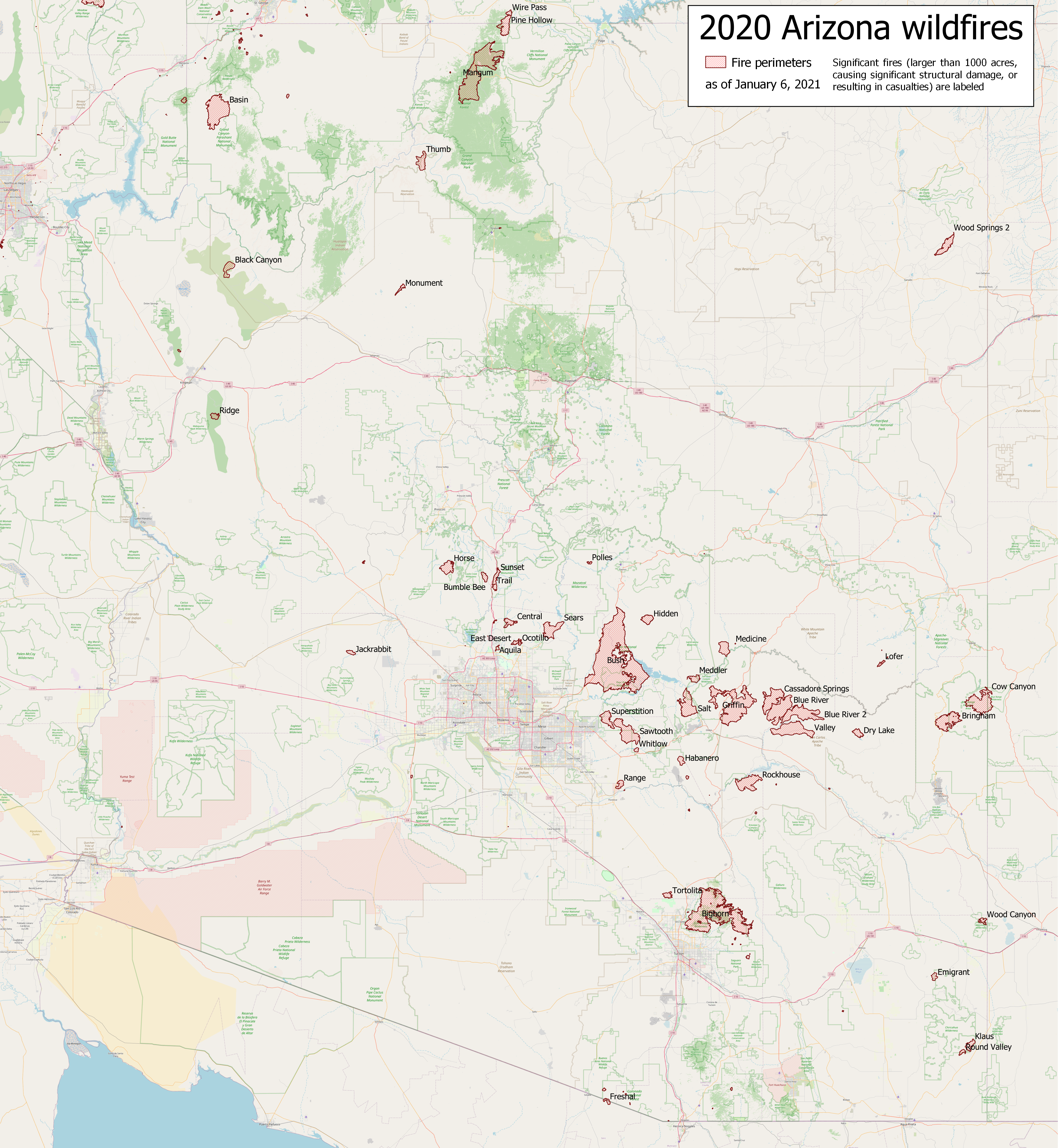
- Map of fires during the 2020 Arizona wildfire season

Statistics
- Total fires: 2,520
- Total area: 978,519 acres (395,993 ha)

Impacts
- Deaths: 1 indirect
- Injuries: 0
- Cost: unknown

With 2,520 fires burning 978,519 acres (395,993 ha) of land, the 2020 wildfire season was the largest wildfire season in the US state of Arizona since 2011. Wildfires occur year-round in the state but are most numerous and typically burn the largest swaths of land during spring and summer. Peak fire season in the Southwest typically runs from May, when conditions are windy, hot, and dry, through mid-July, when the North American Monsoon provides the region with precipitation to slow fire activity.

By the end of the year, more than fifty fires larger than 1,000 acres (400 ha) had burned within the state. However, the most notable fire of the season, the Ocotillo Fire, burned only 980 acres (400 ha) over four days and threatened the town of Cave Creek. It destroyed 20 buildings, including 8 homes.

== Background ==
Historically, while "fire season" in Arizona began in April in desert areas and May around the Mogollon Rim with peak activities near July, there is now a fire risk year-round. Arizona is drought prone, with precipitation much different between the deserts and mountains. When the snow pack on the mountain melts, the moisture can reduce the risk of wildfire events. However, climate change can raise the snow line, reduce snow pack, decrease runoff, or cause earlier snowmelt. A risk of decreasing precipitation and dry monsoons could heighten fire risks. Heavy rainfall can allow vegetation to grow, and many of these plants quickly dry out in just hours.

== Early outlook ==
In April, the Arizona Department of Forestry and Fire Management expected a "potentially active" fire season reminiscent of the 2019 season. Increased grass load from a wet winter is expected to contribute to an elevated risk of fire in the Central Arizona deserts. Southwest Coordination Center Predictive Services forecasted an Above Normal risk for significant wildland fires from May through July for most of Arizona (excepting the Colorado Plateau), with fire potential returning to Normal by August with the arrival of a climatologically average monsoon. They cited above normal fine fuel loading in southern Arizona deserts and an active weather pattern through mid-June to support this risk. A fire department helicopter crashed while bringing supplies to firefighters, killing the pilot.

== List of wildfires ==
The following is a list of fires that burned more than 1,000 acres (400 ha), or produced significant structural damage or casualties.

Name	County	Acres	Start date	Containment date (Note: Containment means that fire crews have established and secured control lines around the fire's perimeter. These lines are artificial barriers, like trenches or cleared vegetation, designed to stop the fire's spread, or natural barriers like rivers. Containment reflects progress in managing the fire but does not necessarily mean the fire is starved of fuel, under control, or put out.)	Notes	Ref
Basin	Mohave	38,804	May 10	May 21	Lightning-caused	
East Desert	Maricopa	1,492	May 17	May 22	Human-caused	
Jackrabbit	Maricopa	2,034	May 25	May 26	Human-caused	
Range	Pinal	3,286	May 29	June 1	Cause unknown	
Ocotillo	Maricopa	980	May 30	June 2	Human-caused; 20 buildings destroyed in Cave Creek	
Sawtooth	Pinal	24,729	May 30	June 19	Lightning-caused	
Sunset	Yavapai	3,964	May 31	June 1	Human-caused; Forced closure of I-17 in both directions on May 31	
Tortolita	Pinal	3,321	June 5	June 11	Lightning-caused	
Bighorn	Pima	119,987	June 5	July 23	Lightning-caused; around 80 homes in Catalina were forced to evacuate on June 12; Summerhaven and surrounding areas on Mt. Lemmon were given evacuation notice on June 16. The Willow Canyon region of Mt. Lemmon and some parts of Oracle were told to evacuate on June 18; Further evacuations were announced for the eastern slopes of the Santa Catalinas on June 26	
Blue River	Gila	30,408	June 5	June 25	Lightning-caused	
Emigrant	Cochise	4,756	June 6	June 14	Lightning-caused	
Dry Lake	Graham	4,369	June 6	June 24	Lightning-caused	
Bringham	Greenlee	23,142	June 6	July 29	Lightning-caused; 36-mile closure of US 191; 2 structures destroyed	
Mangum	Coconino	71,450	June 8	July 27	Closure of US 89A and SR 67, making the North Rim of Grand Canyon National Park inaccessible Evacuations were issued for areas along House Rock Road east of Jacob Lake on June 17; 4 structures destroyed	
Bush	Maricopa	193,455	June 13	July 6	Human-caused; Evacuations issued for: Tonto Basin, Punkin Center (June 14), Sunflower, Apache Lake (June 16); Brownsville, Jake's Corner, Slate Creek, and Pioneer Pass (June 18); Gila County evacuation orders were lifted on June 20	
Central	Maricopa	4,499	June 20	June 30	Human-caused	
Aquila	Maricopa	893	June 23	June 26	Human-caused; 6 structures destroyed	
Painted Wagon	Maricopa	490	June 25	June 27	human-caused; 5 structures destroyed	
Wood Springs 2	Apache	12,861	June 27	July 11	Lightning-caused; 7 structures destroyed on the Navajo Nation	
Boulders	Pinal	1,011	June 30	July 4		
Polles	Gila	628	July 3	July 23	Lightning-caused; A helicopter supporting firefighting efforts crashed on July 7, taking the life of pilot Bryan Boatman. The incident is under investigation.	
Monument	Coconino	1,785	July 5	July 30	Lightning-caused	
Buren	Maricopa	2,800	July 11	July 14	Human-caused	
Navarro	Pima	2,306	July 11	July 14	Lightning-caused	
Jackson	Graham	2,946	July 11	July 22	Lightning-caused	
Blue River 2	Gila	28,051	July 13	July 27	Lightning-caused	
Valley	Graham	29,639	July 13	July 18	Lightningt-caused; 2 structures destroyed	
Pine	Yavapai	2,184	July 14	August 13	Lightning-caused	
Thumb	Coconino	8,354	July 16	July 26	Lightning-caused	
Pine Hollow	Coconino	11,405	July 29	August 6	Lightning-caused	
Cassadore Springs	Gila	21,482	August 1	August 19	Lightning-caused, 1 structure destroyed Kean Fire merged into the Cassadore Springs Fire on August 3	
Bumble Bee	Yavapai	2,993	August 7	August 12	Human-caused	
Goldfield	Maricopa	1,970	August 10	August 12	Human-caused	
Klaus	Cochise	4,864	August 10	August 24	Lightning-caused	
Wood Canyon	Cochise	2,320	August 12	August 17	Lightning-caused	
Quail	Gila	2,064	August 15	August 19	Lightning-caused	
Ridge	Mohave	3,079	August 16	September 2	Lightning-caused	
High Creek	Graham	1,642	August 16	August 20	Lightning-caused	
Griffin	Gila	61,821	August 17	September 6	Lightning-caused; Gin Fire merged with the Griffin Fire on August 21	
Salt	Gila	21,670	August 17	September 6	Lightning-caused	
Rolls	Maricopa	1,350	August 18	August 24	Lightning-caused	
Lofer	Apache	1,256	August 18	September 22	Lightning-caused	
Black Canyon	Mohave	7,897	August 18	September 5	Lightning-caused	
Constellation	Yavapai	12,252	August 20	August 28	Lightning-caused	
Superstition	Pinal	9,539	August 20	September 24	Lightning-caused	
Rockhouse	Gila	19,506	August 21	September 15	Lightning-caused	
Medicine	Gila	8,930	August 22	September 9	Lightning-caused; 1 structure destroyed	
Bozarth	Yavapai	5,000	August 24	September 15	Lightning-caused	
Meddler	Gila	4,452	August 24	August 30	Lightning-caused	
Pilot Knob	Yavapai	11,000	August 24	August 31	Lightning-caused	
Hidden	Gila	6,106	August 25	September 15	Lightning-caused	
Juniper	Graham	2,867	August 27	September 1	Lightning-caused	
Bolt	Maricopa	1,420	August 28	September 4	Lightning-caused	
Light	Graham	937	August 28	September 10	Human-caused; 3 structures destroyed	
Cow Canyon	Greenlee	35,371	September 3	November 27	Lightning-caused	
Sears	Maricopa	14,476	September 25	October 11	Cause unknown; 13 structures destroyed	
Espinosa	Pima	1,834	October 5	October 16	Human-caused	
Encinos	Pima	14,905	October 6	October 24	Human-caused	
Horse	Yavapai	9,537	October 15	October 31	Human-caused	
Habanero	Pinal	3,128	October 21	October 24	Human-caused	
Trail	Yavapai	1,674	October 24	November 2	Human-caused	
Three Hills	Pima	1,350	October 27	October 30	Human-caused	
Round Valley	Cochise	1,587	October 31	November 5	Human-caused	

== See also ==
- List of Arizona wildfires
