= Jacob Lake Ranger Station =

- U.S. National Register of Historic Places
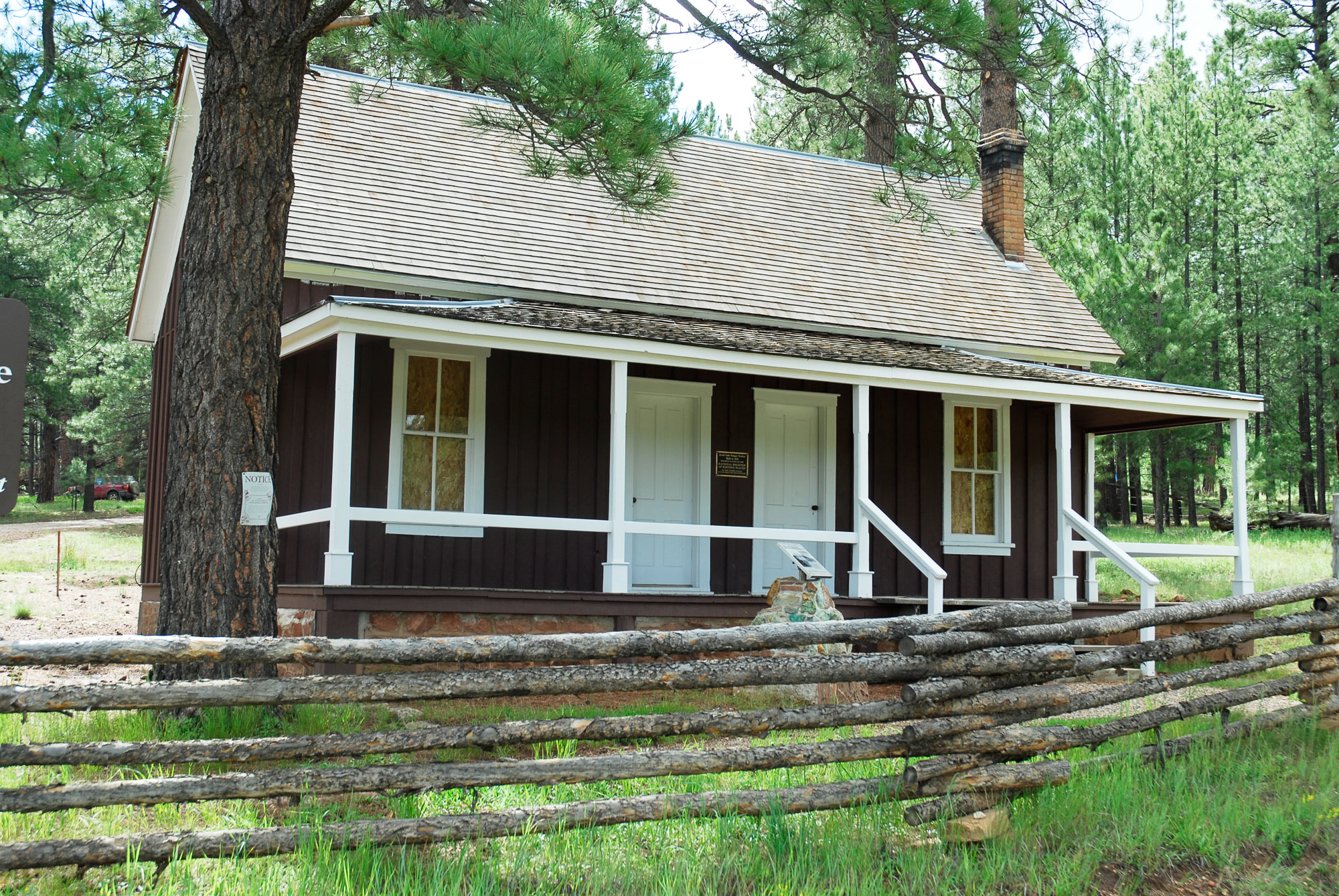
- The Jacob Lake Ranger Station, March 2010

- Location within Arizona Location within the United States
- Location: Jacob Lake, Arizona; United States
- Coordinates: 36°42′23.38″N 112°13′42.53″W
- Area: 1.7 acres (0.69 ha)
- Built: 1910
- Built by: United States Forest Service
- NRHP reference No.: 87001151
- Added to NRHP: July 13, 1987

The Jacob Lake Ranger Station is a historic U.S. Forest Service ranger station in the unincorporated community of Jacob Lake, Arizona, United States, that is listed on the National Register of Historic Places (NRHP).

== Description ==
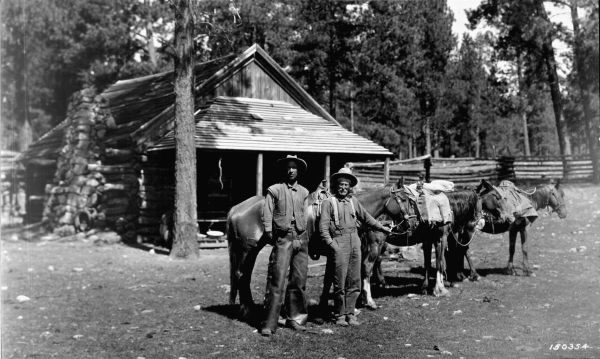
Jacob Lake Ranger Station, 1918

Jacob Lake is at a road junction leading to the North Rim of the Grand Canyon, making the ranger station a major contact point for visitors to Kaibab National Forest until the construction of the nearby Kaibab Plateau Visitor Center. The ranger station comprises a wood-framed cabin and a barn, both adjoining a fenced pasture that surrounds Jacob Lake. The complex was built by the Forest Service in 1910.

The cabin is a 24-foot (7.3 m) by 32-foot (9.8 m) wood-framed structure, resting on a limestone foundation. The walls are clad with board-and-batten siding, and the roof is covered with wood shakes, the only surviving board-and-batten cabin in Kaibab National Forest. The long elevation faces Jacob Lake with a shed-roofed porch across the entire side, formerly enclosed, but now restored to its original open configuration. The interior has two rooms, a kitchen and a bedroom, entered by individual doors from the porch.

The barn is a 1 1/2-story frame structure with board-and-batten siding on a concrete foundation. The roof slopes saltbox fashion from 1 1/2 stories at the front to one story at the back.

The Jacob Lake Ranger Station was placed on the NRHP on July 13, 1987.

== History ==
In June 2020, the station narrowly escape being destroyed in the Mangum Fire.

== See also ==
- National Register of Historic Places listings in Coconino County, Arizona
