= Mangum Fire =

2020 wildfire in Arizona, USA

- Part of the 2020 Arizona wildfires
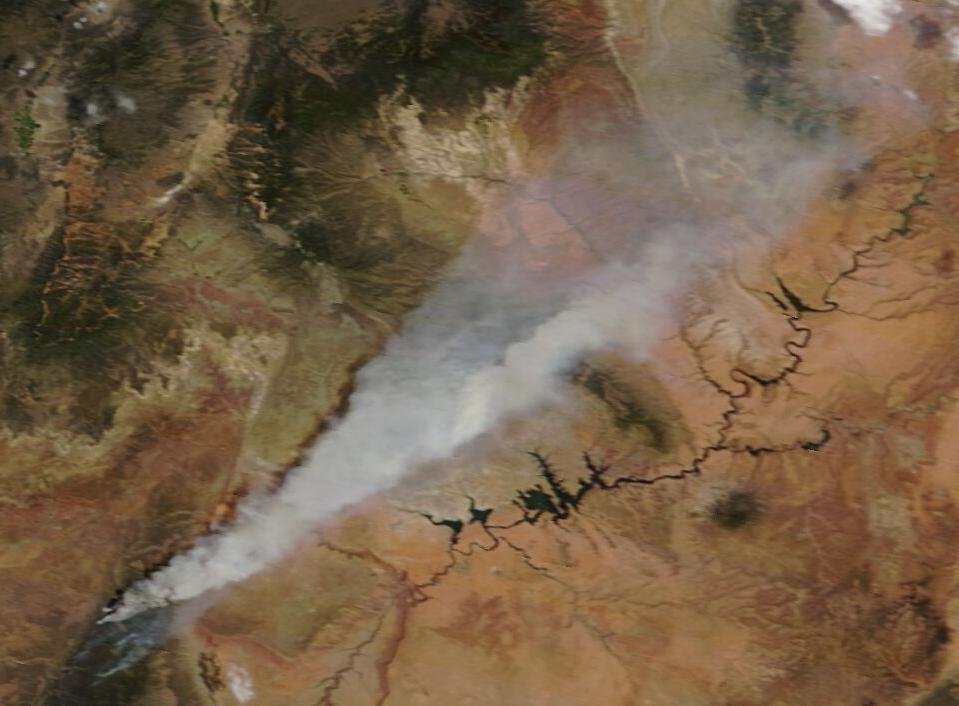
- The Mangum Fire burning in Kaibab National Forest on June 16, 2020 as seen from space
- Date: June 8, 2020 – July 7, 2020
- Location: Kaibab National Forest near Fredonia, Arizona
- Coordinates: 36°39′58″N 112°12′45″W

Statistics
- Burned area: 71,450 acres (289 km^{2})

Impacts
- Deaths: 0
- Injuries: 0
- Structures lost: 4

Ignition
- Cause: Under investigation (human)

Map
- The location of the fire in Northwestern Arizona

The Mangum Fire was a wildfire in Kaibab National Forest in Arizona in the United States. The fire, which started on June 8, 2020 approximately 16 miles north of the North Rim of Grand Canyon National Park, burned a total of 71,450 acres (28,915 ha). The fire threatened the community of Jacob Lake, Arizona, resulting in its evacuation. Select highways were closed, including Highway 67, which resulted in closure of the North Rim of the Grand Canyon. Additionally, areas of the Paria Canyon-Vermilion Cliffs Wilderness were inaccessible due to closures. Four buildings were destroyed, including two historic cabins. The exact cause of the fire remains under investigation, however, fire officials have confirmed it was human caused.

== Events ==
The Mangum Fire was reported at approximately 3 PM on June 8, 2020 on the Kaibab Plateau near Mangum Camp about 1 3/4 miles north of Big Springs, Arizona in Kaibab National Forest. By the time fire crews responded, the fire had grown to 70 acres (28 ha). Smoke was reported as visible from Fredonia, Arizona, a small town that serves as the gateway to the North Rim of the Grand Canyon. By the next day, June 9, the fire had grown to an estimated 500 acres (202 ha). Four hotshot crews and airtankers were called in to fight the fire. Crews dropped fire retardant on the south side, with the intention of keeping the fire from spreading towards Big Springs.

On June 10, the United States Forest Service (USFS) reported that crews were able to control the fire due to low winds and that dozers were to start creating boundaries in order to contain the fire. Fire managers hoped to contain the fire in areas that had recently burned as part of a prescribed burn. Control efforts led to the fire being at two percent containment by June 11. However, by the afternoon of June 11, high winds caused the fire to jump containment lines and the fire began moving northeast. The fire destroyed two cabins and two outbuildings at Mangum Camp. By the evening, the fire had grown to 2,238 acres (906 ha), red flag warnings were in place, and evacuations were ordered for Jacob Lake, Arizona starting June 12.

By the morning of June 13, red flag winds caused the Mangum Fire to grow substantially – to over 10,000 acres (4,047 ha). The fire grew by ten miles to the north with embers jumping half a mile ahead of the fire, breaching control lines. Crews created defensible space around structures in Jacob Lake and burn outs to divert the fire from the community. State Route 89A was closed from Marble Canyon to Fredonia, Arizona and Highway 67 to the Grand Canyon. The fire jumped State Route 89A that day, moving northeast.

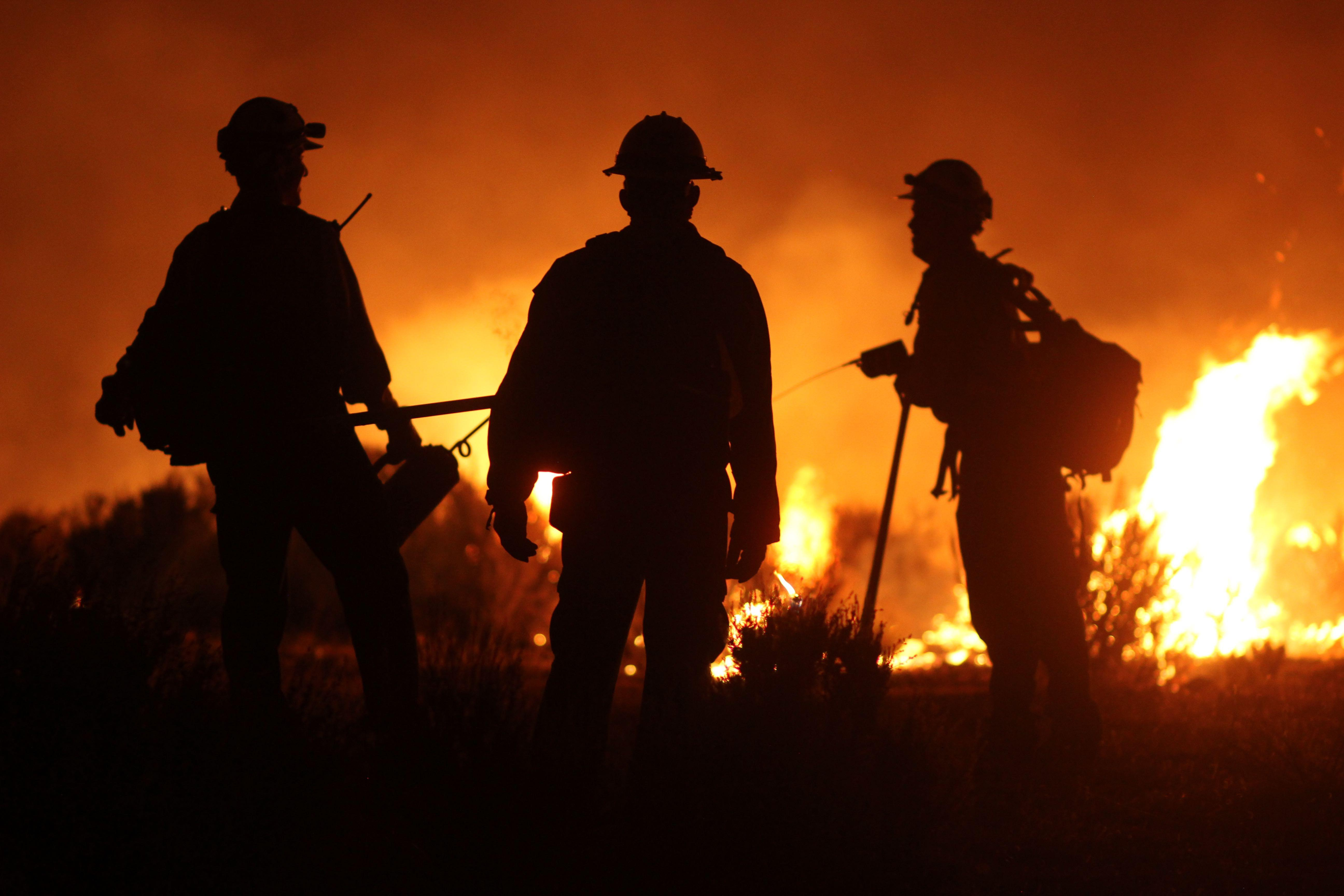
McCall Smokejumpers watch the Mangum Fire on the northeast side on June 23. The northeast side remains challenging to control due to steep terrain.

On June 14, the Mangum Fire jumped control lines towards Mangum Springs, Arizona, being fueled by grass, brush and pinyon-juniper. Two days later, by the morning of June 16, the fire had grown to 47,561 acres (19,247 ha), fueled by sage-grassland, and three percent containment and had crossed onto lands managed by the Bureau of Land Management. The next day, three homes were evacuated on Houserock Road due to the fire moving northeast towards the area. Winds from the fire began affecting air quality, with residents in Tuba City, Arizona and areas west of the fire being told to limit outdoor activities if they are sensitive to smoke. The USFS reported that the historic Jacob Lake Ranger Station was narrowly spared from the fire, burning "within feet" of the building.

While the exact cause of the fire remains unknown, officials confirmed on June 20 that the fire was human caused. The fire began moving east on June 21, with a large smoke plume appearing, requiring further use of air support to fight the growth. Due to the closure of the Arizona portion of House Rock Valley Road, parts of Paria Canyon-Vermilion Cliffs Wilderness, specifically Coyote Buttes and White Pockets became inaccessible. The fire remains active on the northeast side on the north side of Highway 89A due to hard to reach terrain. As a result, incident command added more fire crews to fight the fire. Air support continues, with tankers flying out of St. George Regional Airport.

Due to evacuation orders and threats to power sources in the area, electricity was turned off at North Rim of the Grand Canyon National Park and Jacob Lake. On June 25, the power was restored. Additionally, the containment percentage was re-calculated and went from 68 percent to 46 percent. On June 27, the Wire Pass Fire started on the west side of House Rock Valley Road, burning "extremely close," to the Mangum Fire.

Highway 89A and Highway 67 were reopened on the morning of June 29, 2020 and evacuation orders were lifted for Jacob Lake and White Sage. Evacuation orders were lifted for the two houses on House Rock Valley Road, however, evacuation warnings were put in place just in case the fire threat changed.

By the start of July, the fire grew in containment to 67 percent. Fire suppression repair began. As of July 7, the fire has burned 71,450 acres (28,915 ha) and was 88 percent contained.

== Impact ==
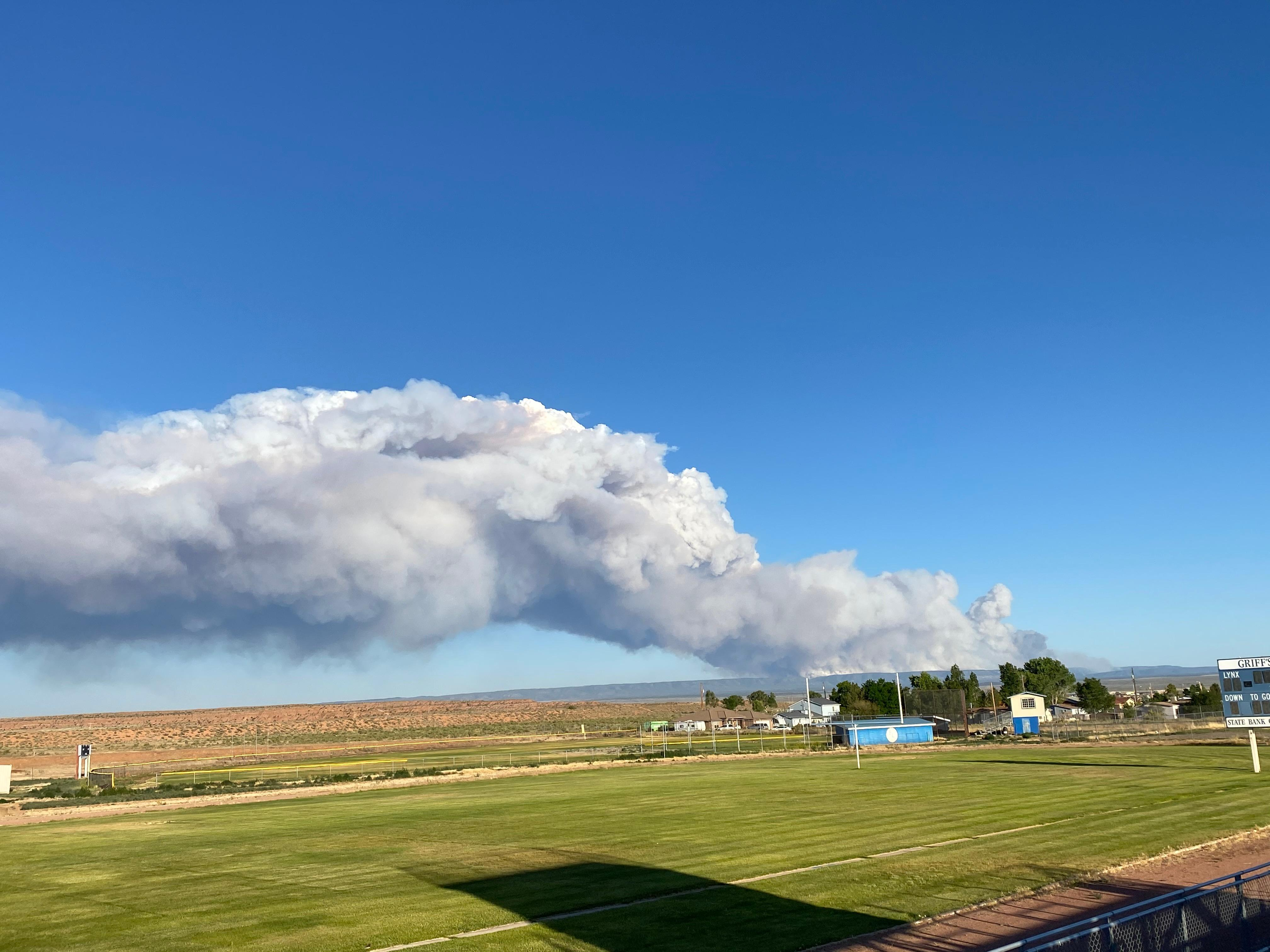
The Mangum Fire as seen from Fredonia High School in Fredonia, Arizona on June 12, 2020

The Mangum Fire threatened the community of Big Springs, Arizona and the main powerlines which provide electricity to Jacob Lake, Arizona. Temporary flight restrictions were put in place by June 11, along with stage two fire restrictions, which prohibits campfires, charcoal, or wood fueled fires. While the exact details are under investigation, the fire was human caused.

The fire caused the entrance to the North Rim of Grand Canyon National Park and lands operated by the Bureau of Land Management, east of Fredonia, to be closed. The fire did not burn in Grand Canyon National Park and the South Rim of the park remained open to visitors. Due to the closure of House Rock Valley Road, parts of Paria Canyon-Vermilion Cliffs Wilderness, including Coyote Buttes South and White Pockets were made inaccessible. Smoke was visible from the north and south rims of Grand Canyon National Park, Highway 67, U.S. Route 89A, and the Arizona communities of Jacob Lake, Fredonia, Page, and Utah town of Kanab. Air quality was impacted in the Arizona towns and cities of Tuba City, Kayenta, and Chinle.
