= Zmanim =

Hebrew terminology regarding ritual times

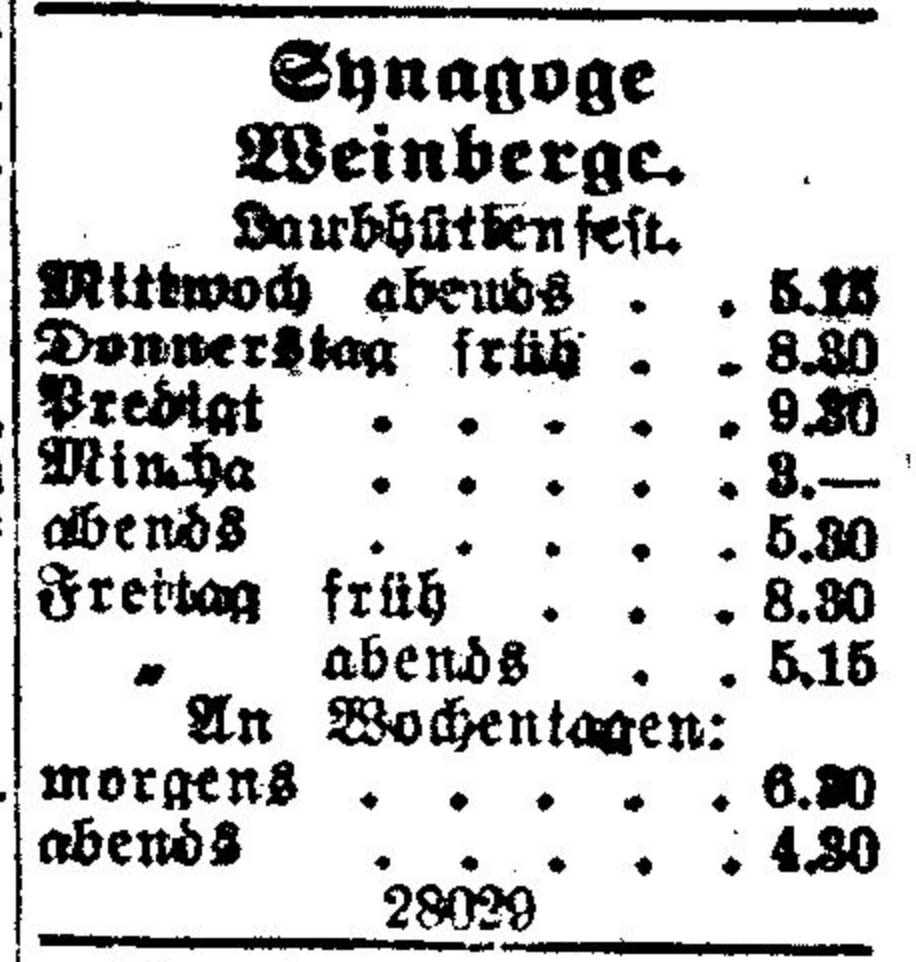
Zmanim of Vinohrady synagogue in Bohemia from 1916 Prager Tagblatt newspaper

Zmanim (Hebrew: זְמַנִּים zĕmanīm, literally means "times", singular zĕman) are specific times of the day mentioned in Jewish law.

These times appear in various contexts: Shabbat and Jewish holidays begin and end at specific times in the evening, while some rituals must be performed during the day or the night, or during specific hours of the day or night.

== Calculations ==
=== Relative hours ===
The daytime period is divided into twelve equal "relative hours" (or "seasonal" or "variable" hours), which can be longer or shorter than 60 minutes, as the period of daylight is generally not exactly twelve hours long. Hours of the day are counted according to these relative hours for commandments: thus, the Shema prayer must be recited in "the first three hours" of the day, i.e., the first 1/4 of the daytime period.

There are two major opinions regarding the definition of the daytime period:

- According to Magen Avraham the period between daybreak and nightfall is divided into 12 hours. Usually this time is computed using daybreak as 72 minutes before sunrise (or more accurately, when the sun is 16.1 degrees below the horizon, as it is in Jerusalem 72 minutes before sunrise on the equinox), and nightfall as 72 minutes after sunset. However, the common practice in Jerusalem (following the Tucazinsky luach) is to compute it using 20 degrees (90 minutes at the equinox).
- According to Vilna Gaon the period between sunrise and sunset is divided into 12 hours.

The result is that "Magen Avraham times" are earlier in the morning than "Vilna Gaon times"; in practice, there are communities that follow each of those standards. For times in the afternoon, the Vilna Gaon's times are earlier, and are almost universally followed.

Near New York, for example, a "seasonal hour" based on the Vilna Gaon's calculations lasts ~45 minutes near the winter solstice, ~60 minutes near the equinoxes, and ~75 minutes near the summer solstice.

=== Minutes and degrees ===
The Talmud often states calculations of zmanim in terms of the time it takes to walk some distance, stated in mil (Biblical miles). Most authorities reckon the time it takes to walk one mil as being 18 minutes, though there are opinions of up to 24 minutes.

Many authorities hold such calculations to be absolute: the phrase "four mils after sundown," for example, means exactly "72 minutes after sundown" in all places on all dates. Other authorities, especially those living in higher latitudes, noted that the darkness of the sky 72 minutes after sundown (for example) varies substantially from place to place, and from date to date. Therefore, they hold that "72 minutes after sundown" actually refers to the degree of darkness of the sky, 72 minutes after sundown in Jerusalem on an equinox. That degree of darkness is reckoned as being reached when the sun has fallen a certain number of degrees below the horizon (for example, 7°5′ below the horizon), and that number of degrees becomes the actual standard used for all places and all dates.

=== Evening ===
One calendar day ends, and the next day begins, in the evening. The Talmud states there is an uncertainty as to whether the day ends exactly at sundown or nightfall, so the period in between—known as bein hashemashot (בין השמשות)—has a status of doubt, as it could belong to either the previous or next day.

The length and timing of bein hashemashot are subject to dispute. Two Talmudic passages provide contradictory statements regarding its length: Tractate Pesachim states that the length is four mil, while Shabbat 34b states that the length is just 3/4 mil. Later authorities differ in their interpretations of these passages:

- The Geonim (and the Vilna Gaon) say that the Shabbat 34b describes the time of halakhic nightfall, while Pesachim describes when all the stars are visible (an occasion which has little halakhic significance).
- Rabbeinu Tam (and many other Rishonim) say that there are two times called "sundown": Pesachim describes the actual sundown (four mil before nightfall), while Shabbat 34b describes a time 3/4 mil before nightfall.

These lead to different opinions on the length of bein hashemashot. According to the Geonim, nightfall is 13½-18 minutes after sundown (or, equivalently, when the sun falls 3–4.65° below the horizon). According to Rabbeinu Tam, nightfall occurs exactly 72 (or 90) minutes after sundown (or, equivalently, when the sun falls 16.1° or 20° below the horizon).

A third Talmudic passage (Shabbat 35b) states that nightfall occurs when three medium-sized stars become visible. Until recently, all Jewish communities followed this passage, waiting for the observation of three stars to end Shabbat. This passage seems to contradict the other two, as in most of the world stars become visible more than 18 and less than 72 minutes after astronomical sunset. To reconcile the passages, various writers have proposed that halachic "sundown" (the beginning of bein hashemashot) is not when the sun crosses the horizon, but rather earlier (according to Rabbeinu Tam) or later (according to Geonim).

While Shabbat 35b refers to medium-sized stars, the Shulchan Aruch rules that since we are unsure what stars are medium or big, we must be stringent to wait for the appearance of small stars. Since this time is not clearly defined, most communities (at least for the end of the Sabbath) wait until around 8.5° of solar depression. Some, following the interpretation of Rabbeinu Tam, wait until 72 (or 90) minutes after astronomical sunset; this is common practice in Chasidic and other Charedi communities.

=== Morning ===
There are three times for beginning of mitzvot during the day:

- Daybreak (alot hashachar), when some light is visible, or
- Misheyakir, "when one can recognize [another person four cubits away] (see below)
- Sunrise (hanetz hahama), when the sun crosses the horizon.

The Mishnah lists a number of daytime mitzvot should be performed after sunrise, but if they are performed after daybreak, one fulfilled his obligation ex post facto.

The Talmud in Pesachim (see above) holds symmetrically that the time between daybreak and sunrise is also the time in which one can walk four mils. For morning calculations, daybreak is normally held to be when the sun is 16.1° below the horizon, or else a fixed 72 (or 90) minutes before sunrise.

== Times ==
=== Daybreak ===
Daybreak (עֲלוֹת הַשַּׁחַר, Alot Hashachar) refers to when the first rays of light are visible in the morning.

- If one has not recited the evening Shema by this time, and the omission was not due to negligence, one can still recite it now, up to sunrise, though one may not say Hashkiveinu or Baruch Hashem L'Olam.
- If one has prayed Shacharit after this time, one has fulfilled his obligation ex post facto. Furthermore, most mitzvot that must be performed during the day (such as the Four Species or Hallel) may be done after this time, at least ex post facto.

=== Misheyakir ===
After daybreak, there is a time known as misheyakir, "when one can recognize [another person four cubits away]." This is the earliest time to wear tzitzit and tefillin (though ex post facto, if one did so after Alot Hashachar, he fulfilled his obligation).

Misheyakir is generally calculated relative to season and place, and because there are no Talmudic or early sources as to when this time occurs, there are a wide range of opinions. Most calculate it based on when the sun is somewhere between 10.2-11.5 degrees below the horizon, but there are opinions that make it as late as 6 degrees.

=== Sunrise ===
Sunrise (הָנֵץ הַחַמָּה, Hanetz Hachamah) refers to when the ball of the sun rises above the horizon. It is preferable to pray the morning Shema just before this time and begin the Amidah just afterwards, and praying this way is known as vatikin. Most mitzvot that must be performed during the day (such as the Four Species or Hallel) should be done after this time ab initio.

=== Sof Zman Kriyat Shema ===
Sof Zman Kriyat Shema (סוֹף זְמַן קְרִיאַת שְׁמַע) means "end of the time to say the [morning] Shema." This is three halachic hours into the day. These hours are variable/seasonal hours and refer to one twelfth of the time between daybreak and nightfall (according to the Magen Avraham) or one twelfth of the time between sunrise and sunset (according to the Vilna Gaon).

=== Sof Zman Tefilah ===
Sof Zman Tefilah (סוֹף זְמַן תְּפִלָּה) means "end of the time to say the Shacharit Amidah." This is four halachic hours into the day. Since the Amidah is only rabbinically required (unlike the Shema which is Scriptually mandated) it is common to rely on the later time (Vilna Gaon), thus only a few calendars publish the earlier time (Magen Avraham).

=== Midday ===
Midday (חֲצוֹת הַיּוֹם, Chatzot Hayom or just Chatzot) means the midpoint between sunrise and sunset, or equivalently between daybreak and sundown. The absolute latest time for the Shacharit Amidah, ex post facto, is this time. On the Shabbat and on holidays, one is supposed to eat before this time. On Tish'a Ba'av one may sit on a chair at this time, and those who fast on Erev Rosh Hashanah usually eat at this time.

=== Mincha Gedolah ===
Minchah Gedolah (מִנְחָה גְּדוֹלָה, literally the greater Minchah), one-half variable hour after midday (6.5 variable hours into the day), is the earliest time to recite Minchah, although one should try, if possible, to wait until Minchah Ketanah. On Shabbat, and Jewish holidays, it is preferable to begin Mussaf by this time, because otherwise it is questionable whether they would be required to pray the more frequent prayer (Minchah) first.

=== Mincha Ketanah ===
Minchah Ketanah (מִנְחָה קְטַנָּה, literally the smaller [window of praying] Minchah), two and one-half variable hours before sunset, is the preferable earliest time to recite Minchah.

=== Plag Hamincha ===
Plag Hamincha (פְּלַג הַמִּנְחָה, literally half of the Minchah) is the midpoint between Minchah Ketanah and sunset, i.e. one and one-quarter variable hours before sunset. If one prayed Minchah before this time, one may recite Maariv afterwards (at the conclusion of the Sabbath, this may only be done under extenuating circumstances). Otherwise, one must wait until sunset, unless one is praying as a congregation. Furthermore, it is questionable whether an individual may pray maariv after plag hamincha if he doesn't always recite mincha before Plag Hamincha; nevertheless, the Halachic authorities allow one to do so on Friday night.

=== Sunset ===
Sunset (שְׁקִיעַת הַחַמָּה, Shkiyat Hachamah, often referred to simply as ShKia/Sh'Kia/SheKia), or "sundown" is the time at which the ball of the sun falls below the horizon. The next day of the Hebrew calendar begins at this point (or shortly thereafter, at nightfall) for most purposes.

Some sources indicate that if one ate an additional specified quantity of bread, and a meal eaten now includes the new day's additions in the grace after meals, then they are added. For example, these include ReTzei and YaaLeh V'YaVo on Shabbat Erev Rosh Chodesh.

Mitzvot that must be performed during the day may no longer be performed ab initio. Minchah should not be delayed past now, although post factum some halachic authorities permit reciting minchah until nightfall. Maariv may be recited now, although many wait until after nightfall.

=== Bein Hashemashot ===
Bein Hashemashot (בֵּין הַשְּׁמָשׁוֹת, literally between the suns) is the period between sunset and nightfall, and is considered a time of questionable status. On the Sabbath, festivals, and fast days the stringencies of both the previous and following days apply. For example, if the fast of Tish'a Ba'av immediately follows the Sabbath, the intervening Bein Hashemashot is forbidden in eating, drinking, and working. However, there are occasional leniencies.

=== Nightfall ===
Nightfall (צֵאת הַכּוֹכָבִים, Tzet Hakochavim) is described in detail above. After nightfall, it is considered definitely the following day. All restrictions of the previous day go away, and any Mitzvot that must be performed at night (such as the evening Shema, the Seder, or Bedikat Chametz) may be performed.

There is a mitzvah to add some additional time to one's Shabbat observance after nightfall (tosefet shabbat), and thus published times for the end of Shabbat may be a few minutes later than the time calculated (according to whatever opinion) for nightfall.

=== Midnight ===
Midnight (חֲצוֹת הַלַּילָה, Chatzot Halailah or just Chatzot) is the midpoint between nightfall and daybreak, or equivalently between sunset and sunrise. The evening Shema should be recited by now, and the Afikoman on Passover should be eaten by this time. The Talmud in Berachot rules that all "night" mitzvot should be performed by Chatzot, at least ab initio, in case the person would otherwise fall asleep and then fail to perform the mitzvot. Some rise at this time and recite Tikkun Chatzot, a series of supplications for the rebuilding of the Temple.

=== Other zmanim ===
On the Eve of Passover, chametz may not be eaten after four variable hours, and must be burned before five variable hours.

The Mussaf prayer should preferably be recited before seven variable hours, on days it is recited.

== See also ==
- Jewish law in the polar regions
- Canonical hours
- Salat times
- Relative hour (Jewish law)
