= Central Fire (Arizona) =

2020 wildfire in Maricopa County, Arizona, USA

- Part of the 2020 Maricopa County wildfires
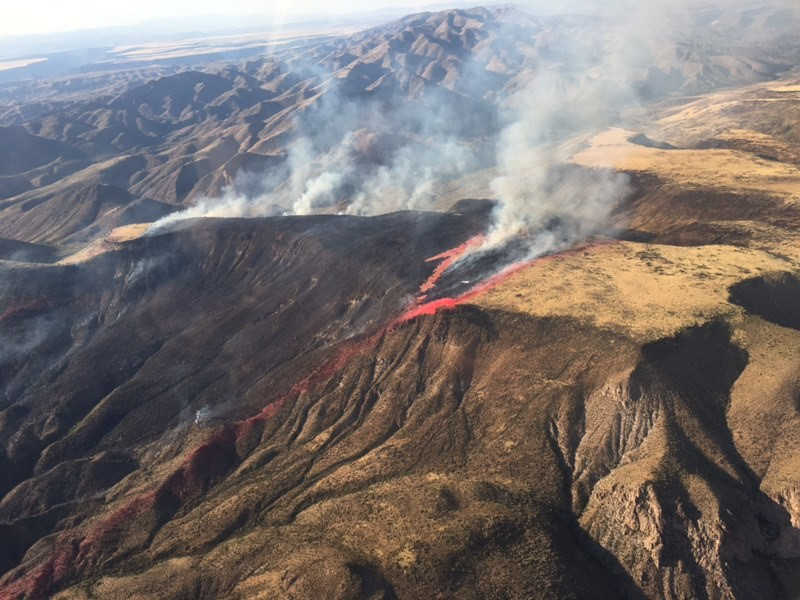
- Central Fire on June 21, 2020
- Date: June 20, 2020–June 30, 2020
- Location: Tonto National Forest, Maricopa County, Arizona, United States
- Coordinates: 33.934°N 112.06°W

Statistics
- Burned area: 4,499 acres (1,821 ha)

Ignition
- Cause: Human

Map
- Location in Arizona

The Central Fire was a wildfire that burned in Tonto National Forest in Maricopa County, Arizona in the United States. The fire, which was human caused, was first reported on June 20, 2020, and burned a total of 4,499 acres (1,821 ha). It was finally contained on June 30, 2020.

== Events ==
The Central Fire was first reported on June 20, 2020, around 11 AM, burning on the border of the Tonto National Forest and Bureau of Land Management land east of New River, Arizona. Fueled by dry grass, brush and hot temperatures, within 24 hours it grew to 3,956 acres (1,601 ha), expanding along top the New River Mesa. Select National Forest lands and roads were closed. On the evening of June 22, it was announced that the fire was human caused.

By the morning of June 23, the fire was 23% contained and covered 4,499 acres (1,821 ha). Due to the fire burning in a rugged area, crews were transported in via helicopter and utility vehicles. By June 26, the fire was 80% contained and Burned Area Emergency Response assessments had started. On June 30, the fire was 100% contained.

== Impact ==
The Central Fire, which burned during the same period as the Bush Fire, impacted air quality in the northern and eastern parts of Phoenix, Arizona.
