= Jewish law in the polar regions =

Discussion of religious practices in polar regions

The observance of Jewish law (halakhah) in the polar regions of Earth presents unique problems. Many mitzvot, such as Jewish prayer and Shabbat, rely on the consistent cycle of day and night in 24-hour periods that are commonplace in most of the world. However, north of the Arctic Circle (and south of the Antarctic Circle), a single period of daylight can last for a month or more during the summer, and the night lasts for a similar length of time in the winter. For religious Jews who live in or visit these regions, the question is how to reconcile the observed length of days in the polar regions with common practice elsewhere in the world. Should a "day" be defined solely based on sunrise and sunset, even if these events do not occur for long stretches of time, or should the definition of a polar "day" be consistent with the length of a day in the rest of the world?

The problem was first identified in the 18th century when Jewish émigrés began to move in greater numbers to the northern parts of Scandinavia. A number of different opinions on the question have been presented in responsa and are reviewed in a 2005 essay by Rabbi J. David Bleich, and in a 2007 article by Rabbi Dovid Heber.

== Scope of the problem ==
The definition of a "day" in polar regions affects mitzvot that must be performed during the day, or at a particular time of day. It also affects the passage of time in the Jewish calendar for the purpose of observing Shabbat and other Jewish holidays.

=== Mitzvot performed during the day ===
Many ritual mitzvot may be performed at any time during the day but not at night, or vice versa. In addition, a lender is required to return clothing used as collateral to a poor borrower if he needs it to sleep at night, and an employer must pay a day laborer his wages on the same day that the work is done.

=== Time of day ===
The most familiar mitzvah that depends on the time of day is Jewish prayer. The morning Shema must be read between dawn and three variable hours after sunrise. (A "variable hour" is one-twelfth of the time between sunrise and sunset, or according to another opinion between dawn and the appearance of stars at twilight. Variable hours are longer than 60 minutes in the summer, and shorter than 60 minutes in the winter.) The prayers of Shacharit, Mussaf and Minchah are also limited to certain hours of the day. The evening Shema and Ma'ariv, though acceptable at any time of the night, should preferably be done in the first half of the night. It is possible that during very long days of the polar summer, evening prayers are not recited, and during very long nights of the polar winter, daytime prayers are not recited.

=== Days of the week ===
The passage of days from one to the next most prominently drives the observance of Shabbat on every seventh day. During the polar summer, hundreds of hours can pass without sunset, and it is possible that this entire period is just one day of a week. However, since Shabbat is observed on the same day throughout the world (allowing for differences in time zones), it stands to reason that Shabbat should be observed simultaneously even in polar regions.

== Pre-modern background ==
The Bible, Talmud, and individual pre-modern Jewish writers do not address this issue, because Jews of this period did not visit the polar regions and were unaware of its distinctive nature. However, the section in Talmud regarding the "desert wanderer" has been used by modern authorities to analyze this issue. The Talmud contains the following discourse:

Rav Huna says, if a man is wandering in the desert and he does not know when is the Sabbath, he should count six days [as weekdays] and keep one day as the Sabbath. Hiyya bar Rav says he should keep one day as Sabbath, then count six days [as weekdays]. ...

Rava says, on each day he may do whatever he needs in order to survive, except for his Sabbath. But should he die on the Sabbath? He could prepare extra food the day before his Sabbath, but that might be the real Sabbath. So every day he may do whatever he needs in order to survive, even on the Sabbath. How is the Sabbath recognizable to him? By kiddush and havdalah [which he performs on his Sabbath but not on other days].

Rava says, if he knows which day he departed on the journey, he may do work on the same day of the week [i.e. 7 or 14 days after he departed, because he certainly would not have departed on a Sabbath].

The law is in accordance with the first opinion, that a confused desert wanderer keeps six "weekdays" followed by one "Shabbat", but he may not perform activities forbidden on Shabbat on any day except to aid his own survival. The law is based on a principle that a person who is unaware of reality should create his own Sabbath while acting out of concern that the real Sabbath may be on a different day.

== Modern opinions ==
Rabbi Israel Lipschitz, in his commentary Tiferet Yisrael, writes that in polar regions there is a 24-hour day, as evidenced by the fact that the sun rotates in the sky from a high point at noon to a low point near the horizon at midnight. He does not offer a means of measuring the passage of a 24-hour day during the polar winter when the sun is invisible. He advises that a Jewish traveler observe the beginning and end of the Sabbath based on the clock of the location whence he came. It is unclear whether this refers to his residence or his port of embarkation.

A result of this view is that two Jews who leave from different cities will always observe Shabbat on Saturday, but at different times. A Jew who leaves from America will observe the Sabbath according to the clock of his hometown, while a Jew from Europe will use the clock of his European hometown, which begins and ends Sabbath about five hours earlier than in the United States. Thus, there is no uniquely identifiable beginning and end of the day in the polar regions.

In some views, the time of Jerusalem can be used to observe the sabbath while in polar regions.

In the polar regions, such as in northern Sweden, where the midnight sun can be as long as two or three months out of a year (in the summer months), or where the sky is dark even at 2 o'clock PM (in the day) for several weeks during the winter, or what is called the polar night, the author of Sefer Ha-brit (Article 4) asks the question, what shall a Jew do when he goes to either the North Pole or the South Pole where daylight is prolonged for as much as two to three months, and, particularly, when wanting to know at what hour he must begin observing the Sabbath day and religious holidays (days that are usually ushered-in at nightfall), or when he must begin his fast on Yom Kippur? He there concludes with the answer that in those places where the day extends more than 24-hours, he is to divide the day equally into a 12-hour day and a 12-hour night, and thereby act according to this schedule, as if it had been truly night and truly day.

Pinchas Elijah Horovitz (18th century) stated that polar regions should observe Shabbat based on calculating 24-hour days, although without establishing a date line.

== See also ==
- International date line in Judaism
- Ramadan in polar regions
