= Polles Fire =

2020 wildfire in Arizona, USA

- Part of the 2020 Arizona wildfires
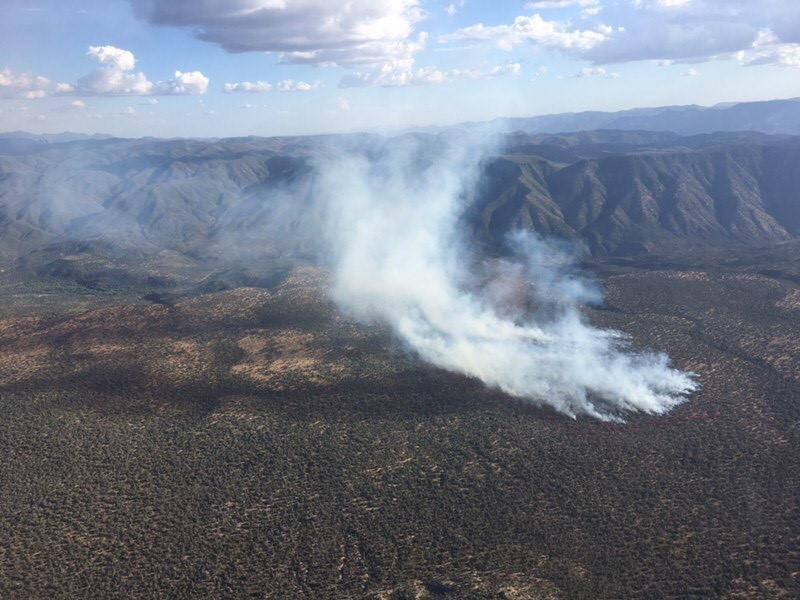
- The Polles Fire on July 4, 2020
- Date: July 3, 2020–
- Location: Mazatzal Wilderness Area, Arizona, United States
- Coordinates: 34.266°N 111.54°W

Statistics
- Burned area: 628 acres (254 ha)

Impacts
- Deaths: 1

Ignition
- Cause: Lightning strike

Map
- Location in Arizona

The Polles Fire is a wildfire that burned in the Mazatzal Wilderness Area, 11 miles west of Payson, Arizona, in Tonto National Forest in the United States. The fire, which has burned 628 acres (254 ha), was started by a lightning strike during thunderstorms. The fire is burning in the along the Arizona Trail. As of July 15, it is 92 percent contained. The fire has resulted in the closure of the Tonto Natural Bridge State Park. On July 7, a helicopter working on the fire crashed, resulting in the death of pilot Bryan Boatman.

== Events ==
The Polles Fire was first reported on July 3 as burning in the Mazatzal Wilderness Area, 11 miles west of Payson, Arizona. The fire started as the result of a lightning strike from passing isolated thunderstorms that day. Two days after its discovery, the fire had burned 549 acres (222 ha). Fueled by pinyon-juniper and high desert grass, the fire is burning in an extremely rugged area, the fire is only accessible by helicopter. Hotshot crews were brought in via helicopters, with helicopters and air tankers providing air support by dumping water and fire retardant. On July 6, Tonto Natural Bridge State Park was closed.

The next day, on July 7, a helicopter fighting the fire crashed in the Mazatzal Wilderness. The pilot, Bryan Boatman, was killed. The incident remains under investigation.

Gusty winds and thunderstorms caused the fire to grow to 647 acres (262 ha) during the weekend of July 10, therefore, containment declined from 95 percent to 80 percent. Three days later, the fire was re-assessed to have burned 624 acres (253 ha).

As of July 15, the fire has burned 628 acres (254 ha) and is 92 percent contained. The fire was contained on July 16, 2020.

== Impact ==
The fire impacted tourism and recreational areas in the Tonto National Forest, including closing Tonto National Bridge State Park on July 6. The fire burned along the Arizona Trail.

== Fatalities ==
On July 7, before 12:22 pm, a helicopter delivering supplies to fire crews crashed in the Matzatzal Wilderness with one person on board. The pilot, Bryan Boatman, was killed. Boatman was employed by Airwest Helicopters, a company owned by the Boatman family and based in Glendale, Arizona. As a result of his death, Arizona governor Doug Ducey ordered all state buildings to fly flags at half-mast in Boatman's honor. Fire crews dedicated their remaining work on the fire in Boatman's honor.

The incident is under investigation. The investigation is being led by the National Transportation Board.
