= Abba bar Pappai =

Land of Israel rabbi

Abba bar Pappai was a rabbi of the Land of Israel who died in 375 (fourth generation of amoraim).

As the second link in the transmission by tradition of Levi II's aggadic sayings, he is generally mentioned together with Joshua of Sikhnin, who was the first link. He addressed halakhic questions to Jose and Mani the son of Jonah, who in turn placed halakhic problems before him.
