= Alafranga and alaturca =

Concepts in Ottoman and Turkish culture

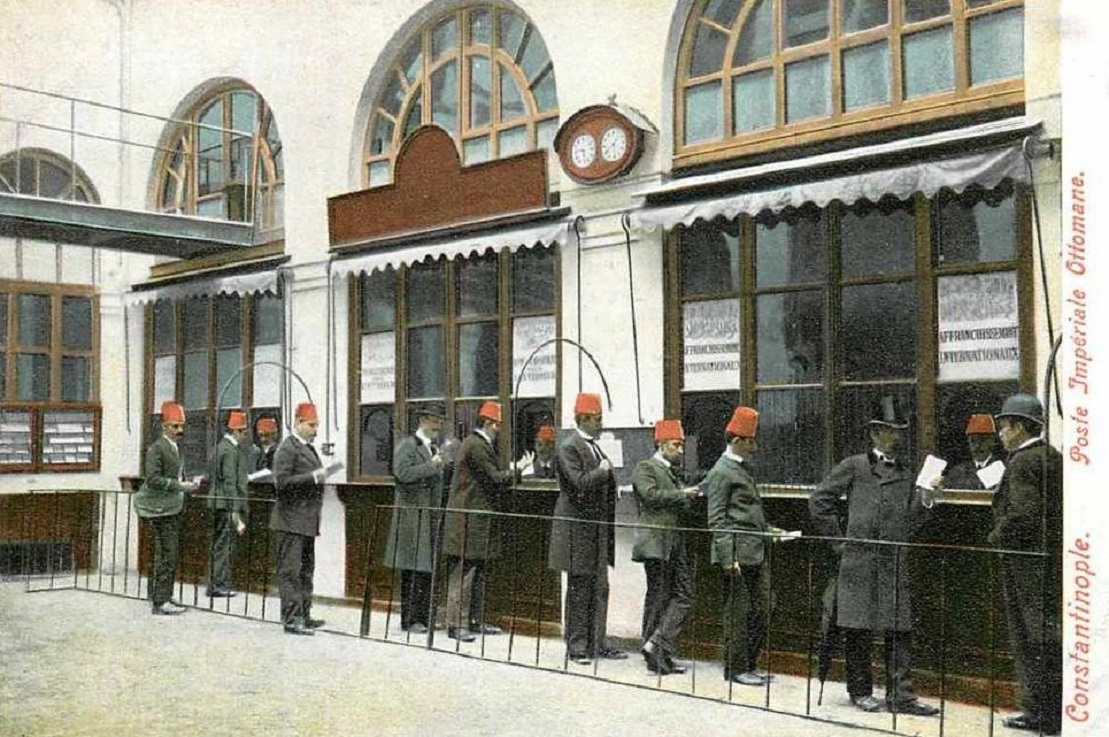
This postcard of the Constantinople General Post Office in 1909 features two clocks, one in Turkish time (starting at sunset, alaturka saat) and another in Western European time (starting at midnight, alafranga saat).

Alafranga and alaturca are musical and cultural concepts specific to the Ottoman Empire and its people. The terms describe a distinction between Western culture and Eastern culture in the Balkans. The labels are now considered outdated, but are useful in understanding Ottoman and Turkish cultural history.

Historically, alafranga and alaturca were adjectives to differentiate between Western culture and Eastern culture in the context of things such as clothing, food and decor. During this time food fusion had some of its most pivotal years because of alafranga and alaturca being so intertwined.

Piano Sonata No. 11. The last movement is marked Alla turca
III. Allegro
Composed by W.A. Mozart, performed by Bernd Krueger

Alaturca and alafranga were also competing music genres in the Turkish Republic in the 1920s and 1930s, after the Ottoman Empire was dissolved. Alaturka was associated with the classical music of the Ottoman Empire, while alafranga was associated with European classical music, along with other western music forms penetrating the country.

- Alafranga is music or other cultural expression in an adopted western or European style (with its own tradition). The term comes from Italian "alla franca".
- Alaturka is music or other cultural expression in a traditional Turkish style. From Italian "alla turca".

The contrast is also found in toilets: alaturka tuvalet is a squat toilet, alafranga tuvalet is a flush toilet.

== Ottoman references ==
- Ahmet Mithat: Felatun Bey and Rakım Efendi: This Ottoman novel defines alafranga and alaturka as, "The term alafranga is French-Ottoman composite of the French "à la" and "franga", meaning "Frank" or "European" more generally. Alafranga thus means "in a European mode". The term alaturka follows the same French-Ottoman composite pattern and conversely means "in a Turkish or Ottoman mode".

== See also ==
- Alaturka: Style in Turkish Music (1923–1938) by John Morgan O'Connell, Cardiff University, UK, SOAS Musicology Series
