= Roman timekeeping =

Hour system with days divided into 24 hours

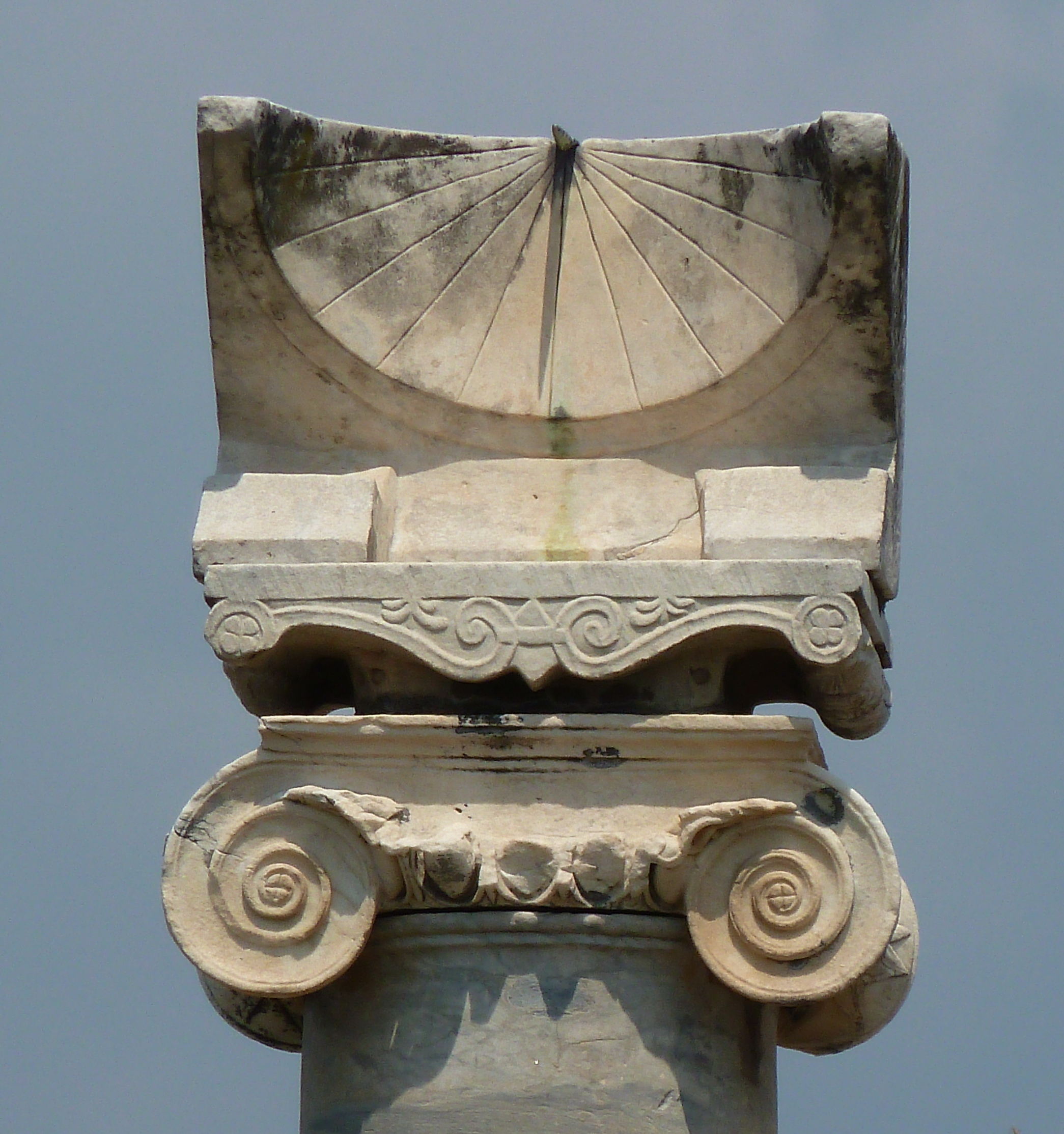
Sundial at the Temple of Apollo (Pompeii)

In Roman timekeeping, a day was divided into periods according to the available technology. Initially, the day was divided into two parts: the ante meridiem (before noon) and the post meridiem (after noon). With the introduction of the Greek sundial to Rome from the Samnites circa 293 BC, the period of the natural day from sunrise to sunset was divided into twelve hours.

== Variation ==
An hour was defined as one twelfth of the daytime, or the time elapsed between sunset and sunrise. Since the duration varied with the seasons, this also meant that the length of the hour changed. Winter days being shorter, the hours were correspondingly shorter and longer in summer. At Mediterranean latitude, one hour was about 45 minutes at the winter solstice, and 75 minutes at summer solstice.

The Romans understood that as well as varying by season, the length of daytime depended on latitude.

== Subdivision of the day and night ==
Duration and distribution of horae and vigiliae on equinoxes and solstices of the year AD 8 for Forum Romanum.

=== Civil day ===
The civil day (dies civilis) ran from midnight (media nox) to midnight. The date of birth of children was given as this period.

It was divided into the following parts:

1. Media nox (midnight)
2. Mediae noctis inclinatio (the middle of the night)
3. Gallicinium (cock crowing)
4. Conticinium (cock stops crowing)
5. Diluculum (dawn)
6. Mane (morning)
7. Antemeridianum tempus (forenoon)
8. Meridies (mid-day)
9. Tempus pomeridianum (afternoon)
10. Solis occasus (sunset)
11. Vespera (evening)
12. Crepusculum (twilight)
13. Prima fax (lighting of candles)
14. Concubia nox (bed-time)
15. Intempesta nox (far into the night)
16. Inclinatio ad mediam noctem (approaching midnight)

=== Natural day ===
The natural day (dies naturalis) ran from sunrise to sunset.

The hours were numbered from one to twelve as hora prima, hora secunda, hora tertia, etc. To indicate that it is a day or night hour, Romans used expressions such as for example prima diei hora (first hour of the day), and prima noctis hora (first hour of the night).

== Timekeeping devices ==
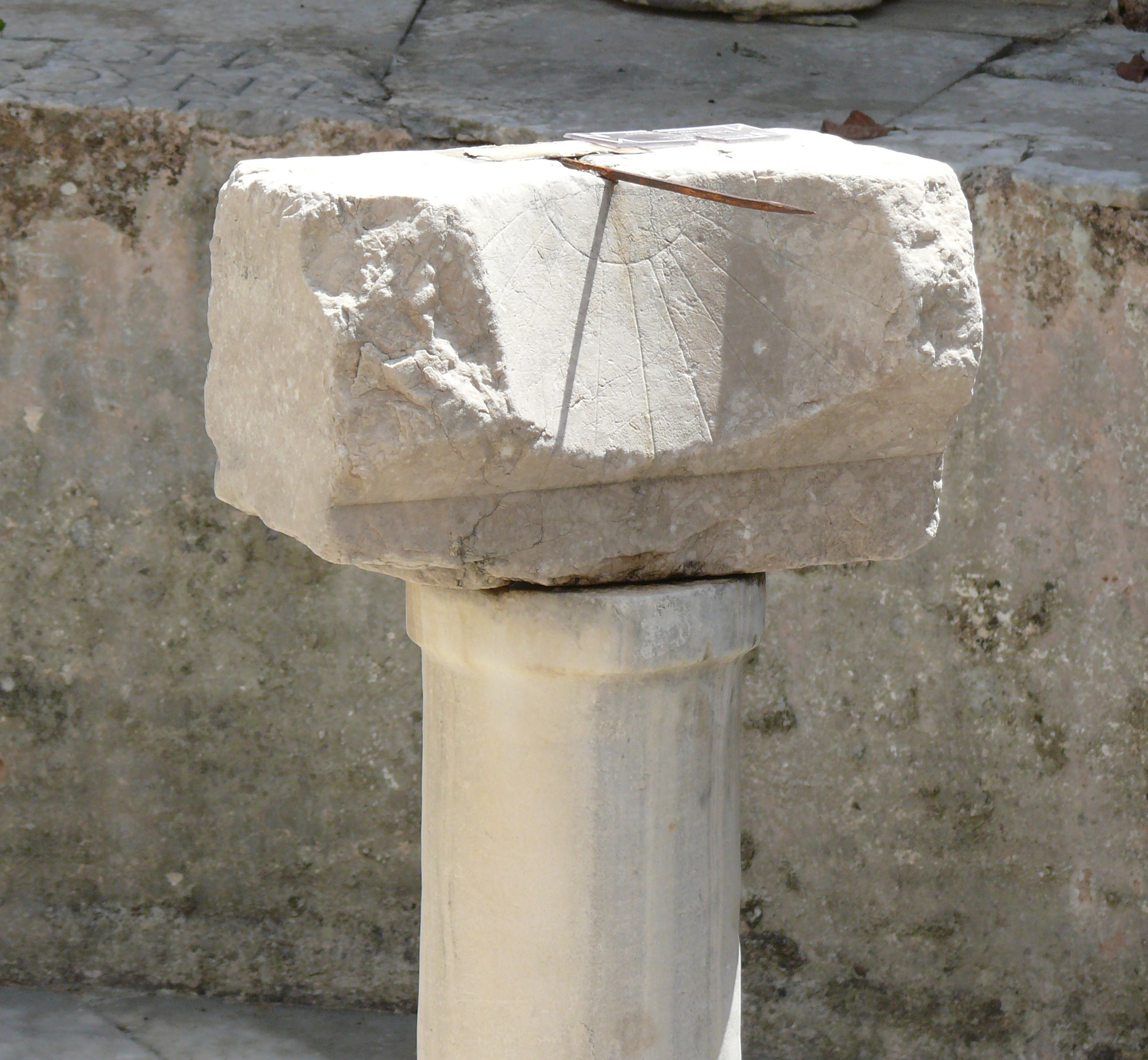
A Roman-era sundial on display at a museum in Side, Turkey

The Romans used various ancient timekeeping devices. According to Pliny, Sundials, or shadow clocks, were first introduced to Rome when a Greek sundial captured from the Samnites was set up publicly around 293-290 BC., with another early known example being imported from Sicily in 263 BC. Despite rapidly gaining popularity soon after their introduction, it wouldn't be until 164 BC that the first sundial specifically designed for the city of Rome was constructed. The main disadvantage of sundials were that they worked only in sunshine and had to be recalibrated depending on the latitude and season. For this reason, they were often used as a method to calibrate water clocks, which could always tell the time, even on cloudy days and at night.

== Legacy ==
The Roman day starting at dawn survives today in the Spanish word siesta, literally the sixth hour of the day (sexta hora).

The daytime canonical hours of the Catholic Church take their names from the Roman clock: the prime, terce, sext and none occur during the first (prīma) = 6 am, third (tertia) = 9 am, sixth (sexta) = 12 pm, and ninth (nōna) = 3 pm, hours of the day.

The English term noon is also derived from the ninth hour. This was a period of prayer initially held at three in the afternoon but eventually moved back to midday for unknown reasons. The change of meaning was complete by around 1300.

The terms a.m. and p.m. are still used in the 12-hour clock, as opposed to the 24-hour clock.

== See also ==
- Byzantine time – 0:00:00 begins daily at sunset rather than midnight
- Alaturka time
- Ancient Greek calendars
- Egyptian calendar
- Roman calendar
- Relative hour
