= Relative hour =

Hebrew term ascribed to an hour of a 12-hour day and how it is to be reckoned

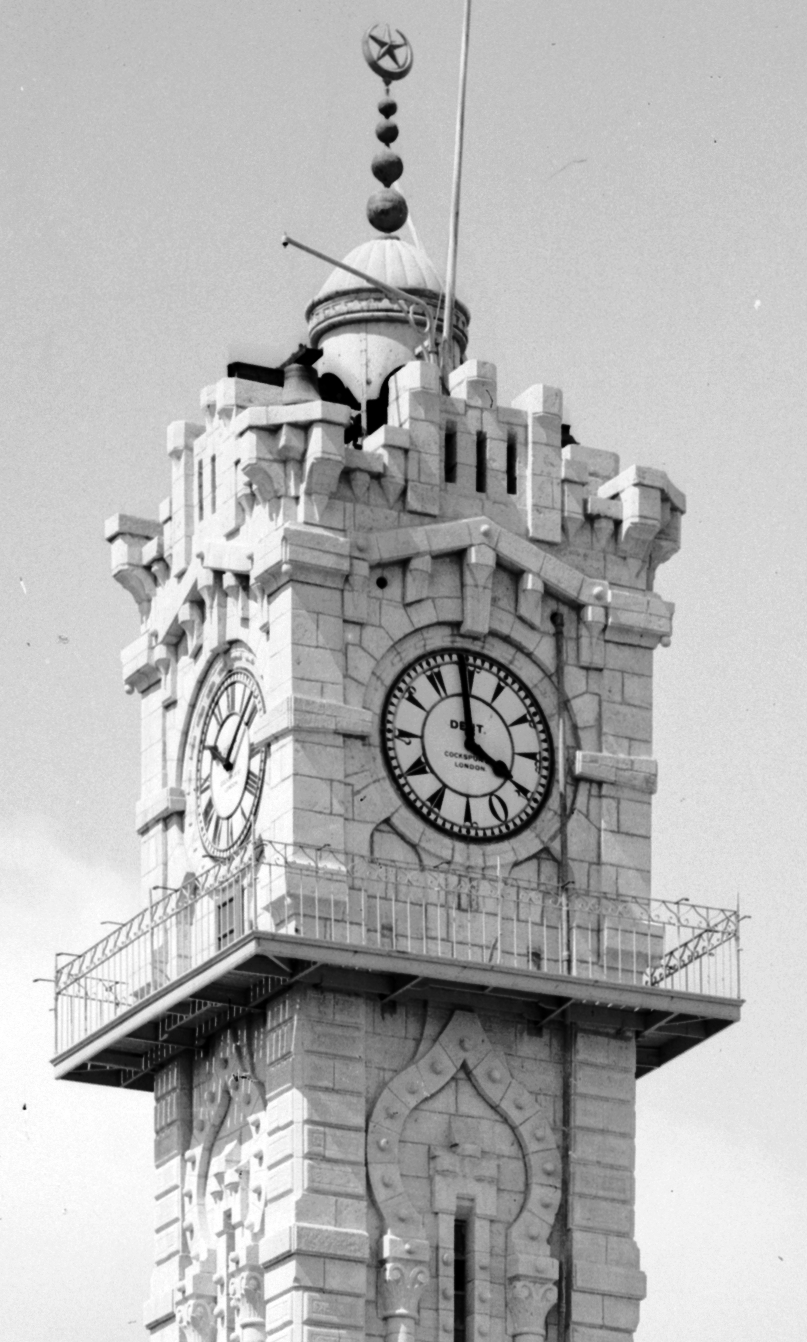
The clock over the Jaffa Gate of Jerusalem in the 1910s. The face on the left shows 10:10 am in the European style that sets 0:00 at midnight and noon. The face on the right shows 4:00 in the Ottoman style, that sets 0:00 at sunset.

Relative hour (Hebrew singular: shaʿah zǝmanit / שעה זמנית; plural: shaʿot - zǝmaniyot / שעות זמניות), sometimes called halachic hour, temporal hour, seasonal hour and variable hour, is a term used in rabbinic Jewish law that assigns 12 hours to each day and 12 hours to each night, all throughout the year. A relative hour has no fixed length in absolute time, but changes with the length of daylight each day - depending on summer (when the days are long and the nights are short), and in winter (when the days are short and the nights are long). Even so, in all seasons a day is always divided into 12 hours, and a night is always divided into 12 hours, which invariably makes for a longer hour or a shorter hour. At Mediterranean latitude, one hour can be about 45 minutes at the winter solstice, and 75 minutes at summer solstice. All of the hours mentioned by the Sages in either the Mishnah or Talmud, or in other rabbinic writings, refer strictly to relative hours.

Another feature of this ancient practice is that, unlike the standard modern 12-hour clock that assigns 12 o'clock pm for noon time, in the ancient Jewish tradition noon time was always the sixth hour of the day, whereas the first hour began with the break of dawn according to many Halachic authorities, and with sunrise according to others. Midnight (12:00 am local official clock time) was also the sixth hour of the night, which, depending on summer or winter, can come before or after 12:00 am local official clock time, whereas the first hour of the night always begins after sunset, when the first three stars appeared in the night sky.

During the spring (באחד בתקופת ניסן) and fall (באחד בתקופת תשרי) equinoxes (around 20 March and 23 September), the length of a day and night are equal. However, even during the summer and winter solstices when the length of the day and the length of the night are at their greatest disparity, both day and night are always divided into 12 hours.

== History ==
Temporal hours were common in many cultures. A division of day and night into twelve hours each was first recorded in Ancient Egypt. A similar division of day and night was later made in the Mediterranean basin from about Classical Greek Antiquity into twelve temporal hours each (Ancient Greek: ὥραι καιρικαί, romanized: horai kairikai).

In Western culture they were adopted from Roman timekeeping and were adopted in the European Medieval era. They had particular relevance in the fixed daily schedule of the monastic orders. This division of time allowed the work of the day -such as eating, praying, or working -to always be performed at the same (temporal) hour, regardless of season (Prayer of the Hours).

== Jewish tradition ==
The prevailing opinion is that each day begins at the rise of dawn (Heb. עלות השחר), which is about 72 minutes before sunrise, yet, for practical reasons in some biblically related commandments, some scholars begin counting the hours of the day from sunrise (Heb. הנץ החמה), such as for the recital of Shema' which, as a first resort, must be recited when a person rises from his sleep in the morning, a time that is traditionally linked with sunrise, and continuing thereafter until the beginning of the 4th hour of the day, or, for example, when burning leaven on the 14th day of the lunar month Nisan, which must be burnt in the 6th hour of the day when counting from sunrise. At this time, the sun is nearly at its apex.

The commencement of nightfall is not as divisive in Jewish law:

Rabbi Pinchas said in the name of Rabbi Abba bar Pappa: One star is certainly day; two [stars] is a doubtful case; three [stars] is certainly night.

The precise, intermediate time between day and night, or what is termed in Hebrew bayn ha-sh'meshot, has been discussed by Talmudic scholars in great detail. Some describe the time as when the evening sky turns a silverish-grey color. The same time is described by Moses Alashkar as "from the moment that the entire circle of the sun sets [below the horizon] until there appear [in the sky] three medium-sized stars." The duration of this time is generally held to be about 12 minutes, but which, with respect to the Sabbath day, is given a more stringent application, namely, 13.5 minutes after sunset. Rabbeinu Tam, disputing, held the time of bayn ha-sh'meshot to be 58.5 minutes. A third opinion is that of Maimonides who puts the time of bayn ha-sh'meshot at the time it takes to walk 3/4 of a biblical mile, a time which Maimonides estimates at about 18 minutes (temporal hours), according to what they have understood from the words of Maimonides, namely, that a person traverses a biblical mile in 24 minutes. This was the custom of the cities of Yemen.

=== Disputations ===
In old times, the hour was detected by observation of the position of the sun, or when the first three stars appeared in the night sky. During the first six hours of the day, the sun is seen in the eastern sky. At the sixth hour, the sun is always at its zenith in the sky, meaning, it is either directly overhead, or parallel (depending on the hemisphere). Those persons living in the Northern Hemisphere, the sun at noon time will appear overhead slightly towards the south, whereas for those living in the Southern Hemisphere, the sun at noon time will appear overhead slightly towards the north (an exception being in the tropics, the sun can sometimes be directly overhead). From the 6th and a half hour to the 12th hour, the sun inclines towards the west, until it sets. The conclusion of a day at the end of twilight may slightly vary in minutes from place to place, depending on the elevation and the terrain. Typically, nightfall ushers in more quickly in the low-lying valleys, than it does on a high mountaintop.

There are two major opinions how to calculate these times:

- The Magen Avraham (Shulhan Arukh, Orach Chaim 58:1) holds that because one may do "daytime" activities between daybreak and nightfall, one calculates the day from daybreak (מעלות השחר) to nightfall, and divides that period into twelve parts. Although this is known as the opinion of the Magen Avraham, he only says it explicitly with regards to the Recital of the Shema because the time for that mitzvah begins at ʿalot hashachar ("break of dawn"). Nevertheless, this is the opinion of Tosafot, the Rashba, the Ritva, the Ra'ah, the Terumat ha-deshen, the Bach, the Eliyah Rabba, and the Pri Chadash regarding all of the times of the day. Usually this time is computed using daybreak as 72 minutes before sunrise - or more accurately using when the sun is 16.1 degrees below the horizon, as it is in Jerusalem at the equinox 72 minutes before sunrise - before sunrise, and nightfall as 72 minutes after sunset. However, the common practice in Jerusalem (following the Tucazinsky luach) is to compute it using 20 degrees (90 minutes at the equinox).
- Another variation of this opinion is to consider the day as beginning at daybreak (מעלות השחר), reckoning the "first hour" of the day with the rise of dawn (Hebrew: עמוד השחר), that is to say, approximately 72 minutes before sunrise, and the end of the day commencing shortly after sunset when the first three medium-size stars have appeared in the night sky. From the moment of sunset when the sun is no longer visible until the appearance of the first three medium-size stars is a unit of time called evening twilight (Hebrew: בין השמשות). In the Talmud, twilight is estimated at being the time that it takes a person to walk three quarters of a biblical mile (i.e. 1,500 cubits, insofar that a biblical mile is equal to 2,000 cubits). According to Maran's Shulhan Arukh, a man traverses a biblical mile in 18 minutes, meaning, one is able to walk three quarters of a mile in 13½ minutes. According to Maimonides, a man walks a biblical mile in 24 minutes, meaning, three quarters of a mile is done in 18 minutes. In Jewish law, the short period of dusk or twilight (from the moment the sun has disappeared over the horizon until the appearance of the first three stars) is a space of time whose designation is doubtful, partly considered day and partly considered night. When the first medium-size star appears in the night sky, it is still considered day; when the second star appears, it is an ambiguous case. When the third star appears, it is the beginning of the first hour of the night. Between the break of dawn and the first three medium-size stars that appear in the night sky there are always 12 hours. This version of this opinion is followed by many Sephardic communities. Nevertheless, Rabbi Yehosef Schwartz, Rabbi Yechiel Michel Tucazinsky, Rabbi Avraham Chaim Naeh, Rabbi Yitzchok Yaakov Weiss, Rabbi Aharon Kotler and many others reject this opinion because it causes "midday" to be at a time when the sun is not at its highest point, and the Talmud says explicitly that the sun is at its highest point at noon (Heb. chatzot). These poskim thus insist that even if one would rule according to the Geonim with regards to the emergence of stars, the time of the day are computed using tzeit kol ha-kokhavim in order to make midday when the sun is at its highest point.
- The Vilna Gaon holds that although "daytime" activities can start as early as daybreak and end as late as nightfall, their proper time lechatchila (ab initio) is from sunrise to sunset, so one calculates the day from sunrise to sunset and divides that period into twelve parts. This is also the opinion of Rav Nisim Gaon, Rav Saadya Gaon, Rav Hai Gaon, Rabbeinu Chananel, Maimonides, Rabbeinu Yonah, and the Levush. In Roman times, these daylight hours were known as unequal hours.

In the Modern Age of astral science and of precise astronomical calculations, it is now possible to determine the length of the ever-changing hour by simple mathematics. To determine the length of each relative hour, one needs but simply know two variables: (a) the precise time of sunrise, and (b) the precise time of sunset. Since according to the first opinion, the day begins approximately 72 minutes before sunrise and ends approximately 72 minutes after sunset (and according to the variant understanding of this opinion, ends approximately 13½ or 18 minutes after sunset), or begins at sunrise and ends at sunrise according to the second opinion, by collecting the total number of minutes in any given day and dividing the total number of minutes by 12, the quotient that one is left with is the number of minutes to each hour. In summer months, when the days are long, the length of each hour during daytime can be quite long depending on one's latitude, whereas the length of each hour during nighttime can be quite short again depending on one's latitude. It should also be noted that according to those opinions that the 72 minutes are computed according to 16.1 degrees, the further one goes from the equator, the longer it will get, such that in northern latitudes it could become 2 hours or longer.

== Practical bearing ==
In Jewish Halacha, the practical bearing of this teaching is reflected in many halachic practices. For example, according to Jewish law, the morning recitation of Kriyat Shema must be made between slightly before sunrise and the end of the third hour of the day, a time that actually fluctuates on the standard 12-hour clock, depending on the time of year. Its application is also used in determining the time of the Morning Prayer, which must be recited between sunrise until the end of the fourth hour, but post facto can be said until noon time, and which times will vary if one were to rely solely on the dials of the standard 12-hour clock, depending on the seasons.

On the eve of Passover, chametz can only be eaten until the end of the fourth-hour of the day, and must be disposed of by the end of the fifth hour.

In Jewish tradition, prayers were usually offered at the time of the daily whole-burnt offerings. The historian, Josephus, writing about the daily whole-burnt offering, says that it was offered twice each day, in the morning and about the ninth hour. The Mishnah, a compendium of Jewish oral laws compiled in the late 2nd-century CE, says of the morning daily offering that it was offered in the fourth hour, but says of the late afternoon offering: "The daily whole-burnt offering was slaughtered at a half after the eighth hour, and offered up at a half after the ninth hour." Elsewhere, when describing the slaughter of the Passover offerings on the eve of Passover (the 14th day of the lunar month Nisan), Josephus writes: "...their feast which is called the Passover, when they slay their sacrifices, from the ninth hour to the eleventh, etc." (roughly corresponding to 3 o'clock pm to 5 o'clock pm). Conversely, the Mishnah states that on the eve of Passover the daily whole-burnt offering was slaughtered at a half past the seventh hour, and offered up at a half past the eighth hour.

== See also ==
- Zmanim
- Lunar calendar
- Hebrew calendar
- Biblical and Talmudic units of measurement
- Roman timekeeping
- Alaturka time
- Traditional Chinese timekeeping
- Japanese clock
