= Time in Turkey =

Time in Europe: Light Blue / Western European Time / Greenwich Mean Time (UTC); Blue / Western European Time / Greenwich Mean Time (UTC); Blue / Western European Summer Time / British Summer Time / Irish Standard Time (UTC+1); Red / Central European Time (UTC+1); Red / Central European Summer Time (UTC+2); Yellow / Eastern European Time / Kaliningrad Time (UTC+2); Ochre / Eastern European Time (UTC+2); Ochre / Eastern European Summer Time (UTC+3); Green / Moscow Time / Turkey Time (UTC+3); Turquoise / Armenia Time / Azerbaijan Time / Georgia Time / Samara Time (UTC+4); ▉▉▉▉ Pale hues: Standard time observed all year ▉▉▉ Dark hues: Daylight saving time

In Turkey, time is given by UTC+03:00 year-round. This time is also called Turkey Time (TRT). (Note: Turkish: Türkiye Saati (TSI)) This time zone coincides with the Moscow Time and Arabia Standard Time zones. TRT was adopted by the Turkish Government on 8 September 2016. It was also in use in Northern Cyprus until it reverted to Eastern European Time (EET) in October 2017.

During some seasons (March–October), the TRT coincides with the Eastern European Summer Time (the daylight-saving version of the Eastern European Time). The IANA time zone identifier for Turkey is Europe/Istanbul.

== History ==
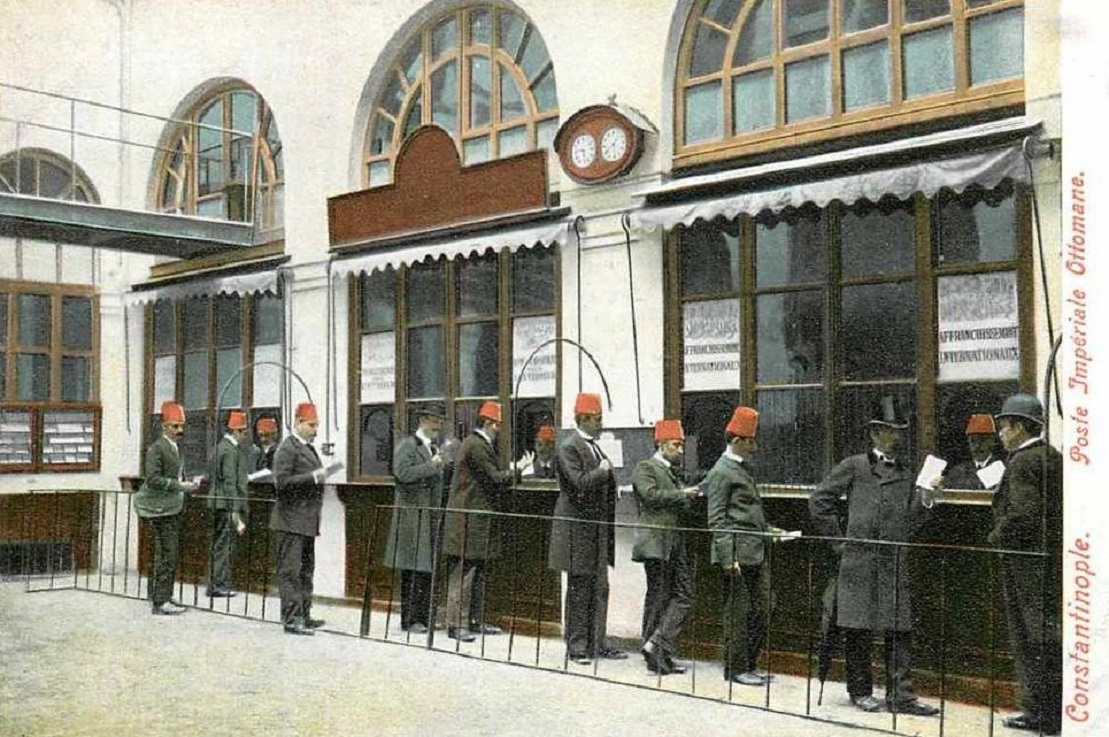
This postcard of the Istanbul General Post Office in 1909 features two clocks, one in Turkish time (alaturka saat) and another in Western European time (alafranga saat).

Until 1927, "Turkish time" (or alla turca time or ezânî time) referred to the system of setting the clocks to 12:00 midnight at sunset. This necessitated adjusting the clocks daily, although tower clocks were only reset two or three times a week, and the precise time varied from one location to another depending on latitude and longitude.

The day was divided into two 12-hour periods, with the second 12:00 occurring at a "theoretical sunrise". In practice, the Turkish railroads used both Turkish time (for public schedules) and eastern European time (for actually scheduling the trains), and government telegraph lines used St. Sophia time (i.e., Paris time + 1:47:32) for international telegrams.

From 1927 to 2016, Turkey used Eastern European Time (EET) in the winter (UTC+02:00) and Eastern European Summer Time (EEST) (UTC+03:00) during the summer. The date for transition between standard time and daylight saving time generally followed EU rules, but had variations in some years.

In September 2016, the decision to stay on UTC+03:00 (summer time) year-round was enacted. However, in October 2017, the Turkish government announced that starting the next year, on 28 October 2018, the country would revert to EET and EEST, but this sudden decision was reversed in November 2017. In October 2018, a presidential decree announced that the UTC+03:00 would remain the year-round permanent time zone for the country.

Today, during the warmer part of the year (March–October), TRT is the same as EEST (Eastern European Summer Time), while in the remainder of the year it is an hour ahead of EET (Eastern European Time).

== See also ==
- Byzantine time – 0:00:00 begins daily at sunset rather than midnight
- Roman timekeeping – Hour system with days divided into 24 hours
- Daylight saving time in Turkey
