= Bush Fire (Arizona) =

2020 wildfire in Arizona, USA

- Part of the Maricopa County wildfires
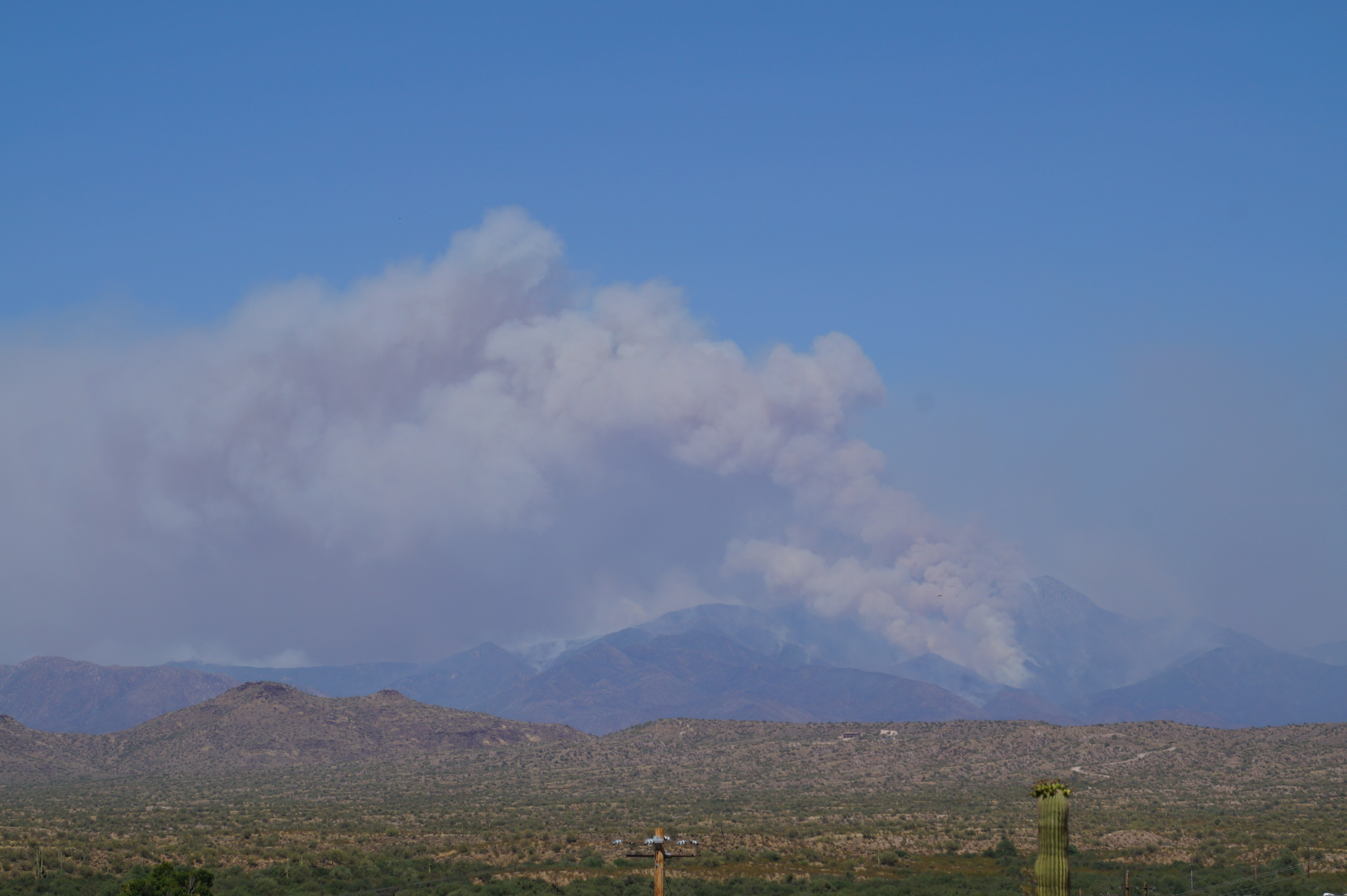
- The Bush Fire seen from Fort McDowell on June 16.
- Date: June 13, 2020 - July 6, 2020
- Location: Tonto National Forest
- Coordinates: 33.629°N 111.564°W

Statistics
- Burned area: 193,455 acres (78,288 ha)

Ignition
- Cause: Human

Map
- Map
- Location in Arizona

The Bush Fire was a human-caused wildfire that started in the Tonto National Forest northeast of Phoenix, Arizona. It burned 193,455 acres (78,288 ha). The fire started on June 13, 2020 near the intersection of Bush Highway and SR 87 and was fully contained on July 6, 2020.

== Events ==
By June 16, 2020, the fire had burned more than 64,500 acres (26,100 ha) with 0% containment and was the largest fire burning in the US at that time.

By the morning of June 17, 2020, the fire had burned more than 89,059 (36,041 ha) acres with 5% containment.

By the morning of June 18, 2020, the fire had burned around 25,882 acres since the previous morning. The burned area has grown to 114,941 while containment remained at 5%.

On July 6, 2020 the fire was fully contained.

== Impact ==
On June 15, 2020, the Gila County Sheriff's Office began issuing evacuation orders for nearby residents with the Maricopa County Sheriff's Office issuing orders the following day.

Multiple highways were closed due to the fire.

== Gallery ==
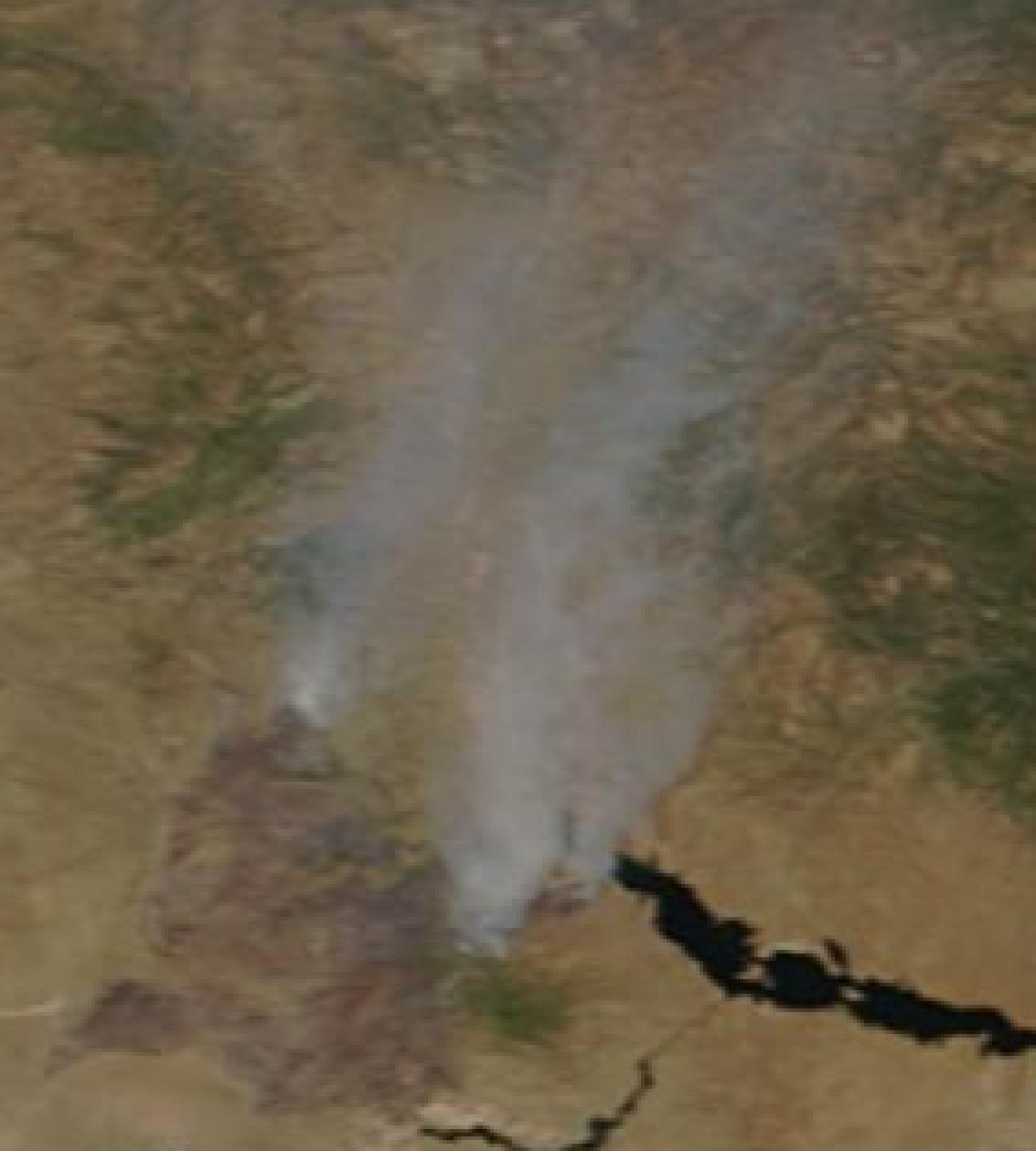
The Bush Fire burning in central Arizona on June 17, 2020 as seen from space
