= List of date formats by country =

The legal and cultural expectations for date and time representation vary between countries, and it is important to be aware of the forms of all-numeric calendar dates used in a particular country to know what date is intended.

Writers have traditionally written abbreviated dates according to their local custom, creating all-numeric equivalents to day–month formats such as "10 November 2026" (10/11/26, 10/11/2026, 10-11-2026 or 10.11.2026) and month–day formats such as "November 10, 2026" (11/10/26 or 11/10/2026). This can result in dates that are impossible to understand correctly without knowing the context. For instance, depending on the order style, the abbreviated date "01/11/06" can be interpreted as "1 November 2006" for DMY, "January 11, 2006" for MDY, or "2001 November 6" for YMD.

The ISO 8601 format YYYY-MM-DD (2026-11-10) is intended to harmonise these formats and ensure accuracy in all situations. Many countries have adopted it as their sole official date format, though even in these areas writers may adopt abbreviated formats that are no longer recommended.

The Unicode CLDR (Common Locale Data Repository) Project is the world's largest repository documenting a wide variety of time and date representations for different countries and language groups.

== Usage map ==

Colour	Order styles	Main regions and countries
	DMY	Europe: Italy, Netherlands, Turkey, Ireland, etc. North America: Mexico, various Caribbean islands Central America: Guatemala, Honduras, Panama, etc. South America: Brazil, Colombia, Chile, Argentina, Peru, Venezuela, etc. North Africa: Egypt, Algeria, Morocco, Tunisia, etc. East Africa: Ethiopia, Rwanda, Tanzania, Uganda, Somalia, etc. West, Central, and Southern Africa: Nigeria, DRC, Sudan, South Africa, etc. West Asia: Iraq, Saudi Arabia, Yemen, etc. Central Asia: Kazakhstan, Kyrgyzstan, Tajikistan, Turkmenistan; East and Southeast Asia: Indonesia, Thailand, Cambodia, etc. South Asia: Pakistan and Bangladesh; Oceania: Papua New Guinea, New Zealand, etc. Middle East: United Arab Emirates, Qatar, Oman, Yemen, Saudi Arabia, Kuwait, Iraq, Egypt, Syria, Lebanon, Israel, Jordan
	YMD	Bhutan, China, Hungary, Japan, Korea, Lithuania, Mongolia, Taiwan
	MDY	Some US island territories
	DMY, YMD	Afghanistan, Australia, Cameroon, France, Germany, India, Iran, Malaysia, Myanmar, Nepal, Poland, Russia, Singapore, Spain, Sri Lanka, United Kingdom, Uzbekistan, Vietnam, etc.
	DMY, MDY	Cayman Islands, Greenland, Philippines, Puerto Rico, Togo
	MDY, YMD	United States
	MDY, DMY, YMD	Canada, Ghana, Kenya

== Listing ==
=== Table coding ===
All examples use example date 2025-03-07 / 2025 March 7 / 7 March 2025 / March 7, 2025.

Basic components of a calendar date for the most common calendar systems:

- D – day
- M – month
- Y – year

Specific formats for the basic components:

- yy – two-digit year, e.g. 25
- yyyy – four-digit year, e.g. 2025
- m – one-digit month for months below 10, e.g. 3
- mm – two-digit month, e.g. 03
- mmm – three-letter abbreviation for month, e.g. Mar
- mmmm – month spelled out in full, e.g. March
- d – one-digit day of the month for days below 10, e.g. 7
- dd – two-digit day of the month, e.g. 07
- ddd – three-letter abbreviation for day of the week, e.g. Fri
- dddd – day of the week spelled out in full, e.g. Friday

Separators of the components:

- / – oblique stroke (slash)
- . – full stop, dot or point (period)
- - – hyphen (dash)
- – space

Country	All-numeric date format			Details	Official standard
Country	YMD	DMY	MDY	Details	Official standard
Abkhazia	Yes	Yes	No	yyyy-mm-dd dd.mm.yyyy (dd.mm.(yy)yy)	GOST R 7.0.64-2018; GOST R 7.0.97-2016
Afghanistan	Yes	Yes	No	Short format: d/m/yyyy (Year first, month, and day in right-to-left writing direction) Long format: yyyy mmmm d (Day first, full month name, and year in right-to-left writing direction	
Åland	Yes	Yes	No	Short format: yyyy-mm-dd Long format: d mmmm yyyy	
Albania	Yes	Yes	No	dd/mm/yyyy Some YMD	
Algeria	No	Yes	No	(dd/mm/yyyy)	
American Samoa	No	No	Yes	(mm/dd/yy)	
Andorra	No	Yes	No		
Angola	No	Yes	No		
Anguilla	No	Yes	No		
Antigua and Barbuda	No	Yes	No		
Argentina	Sometimes	Yes	No	Numeric format: yyyyMMdd (Example: 20030613) Short format: dd/mm/yy (Example: 13/06/03) Medium format: dd/mm/yyyy (Example: 13/06/2003) Long format: d' de 'mmmm' de 'yyyy (Example: 13 de junio de 2003) Full format: dddd d' de 'mmmm' de 'yyyy (Example: viernes 13 de junio de 2003).	
Armenia	No	Yes	No	(dd.mm.yyyy)	
Aruba	No	Yes	No		
Australia	Yes	Yes	No	mmmm d, yyyy is sometimes used, usually informally in the mastheads of magazines and newspapers, and in advertisements, video games, news, and TV shows, especially those emanating from the United States. MDY in numeric-only form is never used. The ISO 8601 date format (2026-11-10) is the recommended short date format for government publications.	AS/NZS ISO 8601.1:2021
Austria	Yes	Yes	No	(Using dots (which denote ordinal numbering) as in d.m.(yy)yy or sometimes d. month (yy)yy).	ÖNORM ISO 8601
Azerbaijan	No	Yes	No	(dd.mm.yyyy)	
The Bahamas	No	Yes	No		
Bahrain	No	Yes	No		
Bangladesh	No	Yes	No	Not officially standardized. Bengali calendar dates are also used: দদ-মম-বববব	
Barbados	No	Yes	No		BNS 50:2000
Belarus	No	Yes	No	(dd.mm.yyyy)	
Belgium	No	Yes	No	(dd/mm/yyyy) or (dd.mm.yyyy)	NBN Z 01-002
Belize	No	Yes	No		
Benin	No	Yes	No		
Bermuda	No	Yes	No		
Bhutan	Yes	No	No		
Bolivia	No	Yes	No		
Bonaire	No	Yes	No		
Bosnia and Herzegovina	No	Yes	No	(d. m. yyyy. or d. mmmm yyyy.)	
Botswana	Yes	Yes	No	yyyy-mm-dd for Setswana and dd/mm/yyyy for English	
Brazil	No	Yes	No	(dd/mm/yyyy) or (dd.mm.yyyy)	NBR 5892:2019
British Indian Ocean Territory	No	Yes	No		
British Virgin Islands	No	Yes	No		
Brunei	No	Yes	No		
Bulgaria	No	Yes	No	(dd.mm.yyyy)	
Burkina Faso	No	Yes	No		
Burundi	No	Yes	No		
Cambodia	No	Yes	No	Short format: dd/mm/yy Long format: d mmmm yyyy	
Cameroon	Yes	Yes	No	(d)d/(m)m/yyyy or d mmmm yyyy for Aghem, Bafia, Basaa, Duala, English, Ewondo, French, Fula, Kako, Kwasio, Mundang, Ngiemboon and Yangben yyyy-mm-dd for Metaʼ and Ngomba	
Canada	Yes	Yes	Yes	ISO 8601 is the only format that the Government of Canada and Standards Council of Canada officially recommend for all-numeric dates. However, usage differs with context. All three long forms are used in Canada. For English speakers, MDY (mmmm-dd-yyyy) (example: April 9, 2019) is used by many English-language publications and media company products as well as the majority of government documents written in English. For French and English speakers, DMY (dd-mmmm-yyyy) is used (example: 9 April 2019/le 9 avril 2019). This form is used in formal letters, academic papers, military, many media companies and some government documents, particularly in French-language ones. Federal regulations for shelf life dates on perishable goods mandate a year/month/day format, but allow the month to be written in full, in both official languages, or with a set of standardized two-letter bilingual codes such as 2019 AL 09 or 19 AL 09.	CAN/CSA-Z234.4-89 (R2007)
Cape Verde	No	Yes	No		
Cayman Islands	No	Yes	Yes	DMY and MDY are used interchangeably. Official forms generally tend towards DMY. Month is often spelled out to avoid confusion.	
Central African Republic	No	Yes	No		
Chad	No	Yes	No		
Chile	No	Yes	No	In Chile the format dd/mm/yyyy is used only, or you can also say "3 June 2023" or in Spanish "3 de junio del 2023". You can also use the short format, example "03/06/23".	
China	Yes	No	No	National standard format is yyyy-mm-dd (with leading zeroes) and (yy)yy年(m)m月(d)d日 (with or without leading zeroes) Uyghur languages in Xinjiang usually give date examples in the form 2017-يىل 18-ئاۋغۇست lit. '2017-year 18-August' or 2017-18-8 (i.e. yyyy-d-mmm) but this form is never used when writing in Chinese; casually many people use (yy)yy/(m)m/(d)d or (yy)yy.(m)m.(d)d (with or without leading zeroes). See Dates in Chinese.	GB/T 7408.1-2023
Christmas Island	Yes	Yes	No		
Cocos (Keeling) Islands	Yes	Yes	No		
Colombia	No	Yes	No		
Comoros	No	Yes	No		
Congo (East and West)	No	Yes	No		
Cook Islands	No	Yes	No		
Costa Rica	No	Yes	No		
Croatia	No	Yes	No	(d. m. yyyy. or d. mmmm yyyy.) See Date and time notation in Croatia for details on cases used.	
Cuba	Yes	Yes	No		
Curaçao	No	Yes	No		
Cyprus	No	Yes	No	dd/mm/yyyy	
Czech Republic	Yes	Yes	No	(d. m. yyyy or d. month yyyy)	ČSN ISO 8601
Denmark	Yes	Yes	No	Examples: Long date: 7. juni 1994. Long date with weekday: onsdag(,) den 21. december 1994. Numeric date: 1994-06-07 (The format dd.mm.(yy)yy is the traditional Danish date format. The international format yyyy-mm-dd or yyyymmdd is also accepted, though this format is not commonly used. The formats d. 'month name' yyyy and in handwriting d/m-yy or d/m yyyy are also acceptable.)	DS/ISO 8601:2005
Djibouti	Yes	Yes	No	Short format: dd/mm/yyyy (Day first, month number and year in left-to-right writing direction) in Afar, French and Somali ("d/m/yy" is a common alternative). Gregorian dates follow the same rules but tend to be written in the yyyy/m/d format (Day first, month number, and year in right-to-left writing direction) in Arabic language. Long format: d mmmm yyyy or mmmm dd, yyyy (Day first, full month name, and year or first full month name, day, and year, in left-to-right writing direction) in Afar, French and Somali and yyyy ،mmmm d (Day first, full month name, and year in right-to-left writing direction) in Arabic	
Dominica	No	Yes	No		
Dominican Republic	No	Yes	No		
East Timor	No	Yes	No		
Ecuador	No	Yes	No		
Egypt	No	Yes	No		
El Salvador	No	Yes	No		
Equatorial Guinea	No	Yes	No	(dd/mm/yyyy or d mmmm yyyy) for French and Spanish	
Eritrea	Yes	Yes	Sometimes	Short format: dd/mm/yyyy for Afar, Bilen, English, Saho, Tigre and Tigrinya. Gregorian dates follow the same rules but tend to be written in the yyyy/m/d (Day first, month number and year in right-to-left writing direction) format in Arabic language. Long format: D MMMM YYYY (Day first, full month name, and year in left-to-right writing direction) for Bilen, English, Tigre and Tigrinya, YYYY ،MMMM D (Day first, full month name, and year in right-to-left writing direction) for Arabic and MMMM DD, YYYY (First full month name, day and year in left-to-right writing direction) for Afar and Saho	
Estonia	Sometimes	Yes	No	dd.mm.yyyy, d.m.(yy)yy or d. mmmm yyyy (mmmm may be substituted by Roman numerals). In more formal, international contexts yyyy-mm-dd is the preferred allowed format.	
Eswatini	Yes	Yes	No	YMD (in Swati), DMY (in English)	
Ethiopia	No	Yes	Sometimes	(dd/mm/yyyy or dd mmmm yyyy) for Amharic, Tigrinya and Wolaytta (dd/mm/yyyy or mmmm dd, yyyy) for Afar, Oromo and Somali	
Falkland Islands	No	Yes	No		
Faroe Islands	No	Yes	No		
Federated States of Micronesia	No	No	Yes		
Fiji	No	Yes	No		
Finland	No	Yes	Sometimes	Finnish: d.m.yyyy or in long format d. mmmm yyyy Inari Sami: mmmm d. p. yyyy Northern Sami: mmmm d. b. yyyy Skolt Sami: mmmm d. p. yyyy Swedish: d mmmm yyyy (Note: Month and year can be shortened)	
France	Yes	Yes	No	(dd/mm/yyyy) for Alsatian, Catalan, Corsican, French and Occitan (yyyy-mm-dd) for Breton, Basque and Interlingua	NF Z69-200
French Guiana	No	Yes	No		
French Polynesia	No	Yes	No		
Gabon	No	Yes	No		
The Gambia	No	Yes	No		
Georgia	No	Yes	No	(dd.mm.yyyy) (In Georgian calendar dates, century digits may be omitted, e.g., dd-mm-yy.)	
Germany	Yes	Yes	No	The format dd.mm.yyyy using dots (which denote ordinal numbering) is the traditional German date format, and continues to be the most commonly used. In 1996, the international format yyyy-mm-dd was made the official date format in standardized contexts such as government, education, engineering and sciences. However, as it failed to establish itself, the traditional format (d)d.(m)m.(yy)yy was allowed again as an alternative in 2006 (except in areas where there is risk of ambiguity). The handwritten form d. mmmm yyyy is also accepted (compare DIN 5008). See Date and time notation in Europe.	DIN ISO 8601:2006-09, used in DIN 5008:2011-04 (see Datumsformat)
Ghana	Yes	Yes	Yes	(yyyy/mm/dd) for Akan (dd/mm/yyyy) (m/d/yyyy) for Ewe	
Gibraltar	No	Yes	No		
Greece	No	Yes	No	Short format: d/m/yyyy or rarely d-m-yyyy Long format: dddd, d mmmm, yyyy (month in genitive)	ELOT EN 28601
Greenland	No	Yes	Yes	Danish: d. mmmm yyyy Greenlandic: mmmm d.-at, yyyy	
Grenada	No	Yes	No		
Guadeloupe	No	Yes	No		
Guam	No	No	Yes		
Guatemala	No	Yes	No	Short format: dd/mm/yyyy Long format: d de mmmm de yyyy or dddd, d de mmmm de yyyy	
Guernsey	No	Yes	No		
Guinea	Yes	Yes	Sometimes	Short format: dd/mm/yyyy (Day first, month and year in left-to-right writing direction) in French and Fulah. Gregorian dates follow the same rules but tend to be written in yyyy/mm/dd (Day first, month number, and year in right-to-left writing direction) format in N'ko language. Long format: D MMMM YYYY (Day first, month and year in left-to-right writing direction) for French and Fulah and YYYY, DD MMMM (First full month name, day, and year in right-to-left writing direction) for N'ko	
Guinea-Bissau	No	Yes	No		
Guyana	No	Yes	No		
Haiti	No	Yes	No		
Hong Kong	Yes	Yes	Rarely	(yy)yy年(m)m月(d)d日 (if without leading zeros) for Chinese and in British English, (d)d/(m)m/(yy)yy in short format. d mmmm yyyy (Casually many people use with commas: d mmmm, yyyy) in long format. Both expanded forms dd-mmmm-yyyy and mmmm-dd-yyyy are used interchangeably in Hong Kong, except the latter was more frequently used in media publications and commercial purpose, such as The Standard.	
Honduras	No	Yes	No		
Hungary	Yes	Sometimes	No	yyyy. mm. (d)d. The year is written in Arabic numerals. The name of the month can be written out in full or abbreviated, or it can be indicated by Roman numerals or Arabic numerals. The day is written in Arabic numerals.	MSZ ISO 8601:2003
Iceland	No	Yes	No	(dd.mm.yyyy)	IST EN 28601:1992
India	Yes	Yes	Sometimes	In India, the dd-mm-yyyy is the predominant short form of the numeric date usage. Almost all government documents need to be filled up in the dd-mm-yyyy format. An example of dd-mm-yyyy usage is the passport application form. Though not yet a common practice, the BIS (Bureau of Indian Standards) of the Government of India introduced the standard named "IS 7900:2001 (Revised in 2006) Data Elements And Interchange Formats – Information Interchange – Representation Of Dates And Times" which officially recommends use of the date format yyyy-mm-dd; for example, 2013-09-10, 20130910, or 2013 09 10 for the date 10 September 2013. Dates in the Bodo language are in mm/dd/yyyy. The majority of English-language newspapers and media publications in India use mmmm dd, yyyy.	IS 7900:2001
Indonesia	No	Yes	Rarely	On English-written materials, Indonesians tend to use the M-D-Y but was more widely used in non-governmental contexts. English-language governmental and academic documents use DMY.	
Iran	Yes	Yes	No	Short format: yyyy/mm/dd in Persian Calendar system ("yy/m/d" is a common alternative). Gregorian dates follow the same rules in Persian literature but tend to be written in the dd/mm/yyyy format in official English documents. Long format: YYYY MMMM D (Day first, full month name, and year in right-to-left writing direction)	
Iraq	No	Yes	No	Short format: (dd/mm/yyyy)	
(Republic of Ireland) Ireland	No	Yes	No	(dd-mm-yyyy). dd/mm/yyyy is also in common use	IS/EN 28601:1993
Isle of Man	No	Yes	No		
Israel	No	Yes	No	The format dd.mm.yyyy using dots is the common format, following Central and Eastern European usage. dd/mm/yyyy is also in common use. The Jewish calendar is in limited use, mainly for Jewish holidays, and follows the DMY format.	
Italy	No	Yes	No	(dd/mm/yyyy)	UNI EN 28601
Ivory Coast	No	Yes	No		
Jamaica	Yes	Yes	No		
Jan Mayen	No	Yes	No		
Japan	Yes	No	No	Often in the form yyyy年mm月dd日; sometimes Japanese era year is used, e.g. 平成18年12月30日.	JIS X 0301:2002
Jersey	No	Yes	No		
Jordan	No	Yes	No		
Kazakhstan	Sometimes	Yes	No	Short format: (yyyy.dd.mm) in Kazakh and (dd.mm.(yy)yy) in Russian Long format: yyyy 'ж'. d mmmm in Kazakh; d MMMM yyyy in Russian Full format in Kazakh: yyyy 'ж'. dd mmmm	
Kenya	Yes	Yes	Yes	(yy/mm/dd) (dd/mm/yyyy) (m/d/yyyy) for Swahili	
Kiribati	No	Yes	No		
North Korea	Yes	No	No		
South Korea	Yes	No	No	National standard format is yyyy-mm-dd (with leading zeroes) and (yy)yy년 (m)m월 (d)d일 (with or without leading zeroes) casually many people use (yy)yy.(m)m.(d)d(.) (with or without leading zeroes, with or without the last full stop).	KS X ISO 8601
Kosovo	No	Yes	No		
Kuwait	No	Yes	No		
Kyrgyzstan	No	Yes	No	(dd.mm.yyyy)	
Laos	No	Yes	No		
Latvia	No	Yes	No	Short format: dd.mm.yyyy. Long format: yyyy. gada d. mmmm	
Lebanon	No	Yes	No		
Lesotho	Yes	Yes	No	yyyy-mm-dd for Sesotho and dd/mm/yyyy for English	
Liberia	No	Yes	No		
Libya	No	Yes	No		
Liechtenstein	No	Yes	No	(dd.mm.yyyy)	
Lithuania	Yes	Sometimes	No	(yyyy-mm-dd) yyyy <m.> <month in genitive> d <d.>	LST ISO 8601:1997 (obsolete); LST ISO 8601:2006 (current)
Luxembourg	No	Yes	No	(dd.mm.yyyy)	ITM-EN 28601
Macau	Yes	Yes	No	YMD（年月日） (Same as Hong Kong) DMY (in Portuguese and British English)	
Madagascar	No	Yes	No		
Malawi	No	Yes	No		
Malaysia	Yes	Yes	Sometimes	dd-mm-yyyy or dd/mm/yyyy is more commonly used, especially in English and Malay in both short and long format. yyyy-mm-dd is used in other instances particularly in documentation and organizing and also in Chinese (yyyy年m月d日), in short and long format. MMDDYYYY in long format is sometimes used in media, especially written English media, but less frequently compared to the others. There is no 'official' date format used but they are used interchangeably based on the situation.	
Maldives	Yes	Yes	No	Short format: yy/mm/dd (Day first, month next and year last in right-to-left writing direction) Long format: dd mmmm yyyy (Year first, full month name and day last in right-to-left writing direction)	
Mali	No	Yes	No		
Malta	No	Yes	No		
Marshall Islands	No	No	Yes		
Martinique	No	Yes	No		
Mauritania	No	Yes	No		
Mauritius	No	Yes	No		
Mayotte	No	Yes	No		
Mexico	No	Yes	No		NOM-008-SCFI-2002
Moldova	No	Yes	No		
Monaco	No	Yes	No		
Mongolia	Yes	No	No	National standard format is yyyy-mm-dd (with leading zeroes) and yyyy оны (m)m сарын (d)d (with or without leading zeroes) Traditional Mongolian languages in Mongolia usually give date examples in the form 2017ᠣᠨ ᠵᠢᠷᠭᠤᠳᠤᠭᠠᠷ ᠰᠠᠷ᠎ᠠ 2ᠡᠳᠦᠷ but this form is never used when writing in Mongolian Cyrillic; casually many people use yyyy/(m)m/(d)d or yyyy.(m)m.(d)d (with or without leading zeroes).	MNS-ISO 8601
Montenegro	No	Yes	No	Both d.m.yyyy. and dd.mm.yyyy. are accepted. A period is used as a separator and after the year because the Montenegrin language writes these numbers as ordinal numbers that are written as the corresponding cardinal number, with a period at the end.	
Montserrat	No	Yes	No		
Morocco	No	Yes	No		
Mozambique	No	Yes	No		
Myanmar	Yes	Yes	No	YMD for Burmese calendar. DMY for Gregorian calendar.	
Namibia	Yes	Yes	No	DMY	
Nauru	No	Yes	No		
Nepal	Yes	Yes	Sometimes	DMY, YMD in official Nepali Vikram Samvat calendar (also see Nepal Sambat which is also in use); MDY in Gregorian dates are used for newspapers (English language) and PCs	
Netherlands	No	Yes	No	Using hyphens as in "dd-mm-yyyy".	NEN ISO 8601, NEN EN 28601, NEN 2772
New Caledonia	No	Yes	No		
New Zealand	Yes	Yes	No		AS/NZS ISO 8601.1:2021
Nicaragua	No	Yes	No		
Niger	No	Yes	No		
Nigeria	No	Yes	Sometimes	Short format: (d)d/(m)m/(yy)yy for Edo, English, Fulani, Hausa, Ibibio, Igbo, Kanuri and Yoruba language Long format: d mmmm yyyy for English, Hausa, Igbo and Yoruba, and mmmm dd, yyyy for Edo, Fulani, Ibibio and Kanuri.	
Niue	No	Yes	No	dd/mm/yyyy	
Norfolk Island	No	Yes	No		
North Macedonia	No	Yes	No	(dd.mm.yyyy)	
Northern Cyprus	No	Yes	No	Short format: dd.mm.yyyy	
Northern Mariana Islands	No	No	Yes		
Norway	Yes	Yes	Rarely	dd.mm.yyyy; leading zeroes and century digits may be omitted, e.g., 10.02.16; ddmmyy (six figures, no century digits, no delimiters) allowed in tables. ISO dates yyyy-mm-dd can be used for "technical" purposes. The fraction form ^{d}/_{m}-y is incorrect, but is common and considered passable in handwriting. Lule Sami and Southern Sami dates mmmm d. b. yyyy.	NS-ISO 8601
Oman	No	Yes	No		
Pakistan	No	Yes	No		
Palestine (Palestinian Authority, West Bank and Gaza Strip)	No	Yes	No	(dd/mm/yyyy)	
Palau	No	Yes	Rarely	Formerly including: (m)m/(d)d/(yy)yy in English and (yy)yy/m(m)/(d)d in Japanese	
Panama	No	Yes	No	Short format: dd/mm/yyyy Long format: d de mmmm de yyyy	
Papua New Guinea	No	Yes	No		
Paraguay	No	Yes	No		
Peru	No	Yes	No		
Philippines	Sometimes	Sometimes	Yes	Long format: mmmm d, yyyy for both languages. DMY dates in English are also used occasionally, primarily by, but not limited to, government institutions such as on the data page of passports, immigration and customs forms, and almost all formal and/or official written correspondences. Filipino (Tagalog): ika-d ng mmmm(,) yyyy or d mmmm yyyy (Note: Only the year can be shortened when the date is expressed in DMY. Filipino (or Tagalog) dates are written in mmmm d, yyyy format in almost all cases but still spoken as above.) Short/numerical format: mm/dd/yyyy (mm/dd/yy occasionally) for both languages. Use of hyphen or period as separators are now seldomly encountered. YMD format may also used for technical, professional and/or digital purposes.	
Pitcairn Islands	No	Yes	No		
Poland	Sometimes	Yes	No	Traditional format (DMY): (dd.mm.yyyy, often with dots as separators; more official is d <month in genitive> yyyy, or, less frequently, d <month in Roman numerals> yyyy) Official format (YMD): The ISO 8601 YYYY-MM-DD format is used in official documents, banks, computer systems and the internet in Poland.	PN-90/N-01204
Portugal	Yes	Yes	No	Mostly (dd/mm/yyyy) and (dd-mm-yyyy); some newer documents use (yyyy-mm-dd).	NP EN 28601
Puerto Rico	No	Yes	Yes	English: mmmm d, yyyy Spanish: d de mmmm de yyyy	
Qatar	No	Yes	No		
Réunion	No	Yes	No		
Romania	No	Yes	No	(dd.mm.yyyy) Also widely used: (d)d-mmm-yyyy (3 letters of month name with the notable exception of Nov for November, which would otherwise be noiembrie) and (d)d-XII-yyyy (month number as a Roman numeral with lines above AND below, slowly deprecating)	
Russia	Yes	Yes	No	yyyy-mm-dd dd.mm.yyyy (dd.mm.(yy)yy); more official is d <month in genitive> yyyy г. (= g., short for goda, i.e. year in genitive) Bashkir, Ossetian, Sakha and Tatar languages in Russia usually give date examples in the form 22 май 2017 й, 22 майы, 2017 аз, ыам ыйын 22 күнэ 2017 с., 22 май 2017 ел but this form is never used when writing in Russian.	GOST R 7.0.64-2018; GOST R 7.0.97-2016
Rwanda	No	Yes	No		
Saba	No	Yes	No		
Saint Barthélemy	No	Yes	No		
Saint Helena, Ascension and Tristan da Cunha	No	Yes	No		
Saint Kitts and Nevis	No	Yes	No		
Saint Lucia	No	Yes	No		
Saint Martin	No	Yes	No		
Saint Pierre and Miquelon	No	Yes	No		
Saint Vincent and the Grenadines	No	Yes	No		
Samoa	No	Yes	No		
San Marino	No	Yes	No		
São Tomé and Príncipe	No	Yes	No		
Saudi Arabia	No	Yes	No	(dd/mm/yyyy in Islamic and Gregorian calendar systems,	
Senegal	No	Yes	No		
Serbia	No	Yes	No	(d.m.yyyy. or d. mmmm yyyy.)	
Seychelles	No	Yes	No		
Sierra Leone	No	Yes	No		
Singapore	Yes	Yes	Sometimes	(Chinese representation: yyyy年m月d日, no leading zeroes) DMY in English, Malay and Tamil languages MDY (in long format) also sometimes used, especially in media publications, commercial usage, and some governmental websites.	
Sint Eustatius	No	Yes	No		
Sint Maarten	No	Yes	No		
Slovakia	No	Yes	No	(d. m. yyyy)	
Slovenia	No	Yes	No	(d. m. yyyy or d. mmmm yyyy)	
Solomon Islands	No	Yes	No		
Somalia	No	Yes	No	Short format: dd/mm/yyyy	
South Africa	Yes	Yes	Sometimes	(yyyy/mm/dd and dd mmmm yyyy) in English (yyyy-mm-dd and dd mmmm yyyy) in Afrikaans (yyyy-mm-dd and yyyy mmmm d) in Xhosa; MDY in Zulu	SANS 8601:2009
South Ossetia	Yes	Yes	No	yyyy-mm-dd dd.mm.yyyy (dd.mm.(yy)yy)	GOST R 7.0.64-2018; GOST R 7.0.97-2016
Spain	Yes	Yes	No	(dd/mm/yyyy) for Asturian, Catalan, Galician, Spanish and Valencian (yyyy/mm/dd) for Basque	UNE EN 28601
Sri Lanka	Yes	Yes	Rarely	(yyyy-mm-dd) for Sinhala and (d-m-yyyy) for Tamil English-language media and commercial publications use Month-day-year in long format, but only Day-month-year format (both long and short numeric) are used in governmental and other English documents of official contexts.	
Sudan	No	Yes	No		
South Sudan	No	Yes	No		
Suriname	No	Yes	No		
Svalbard	No	Yes	No		
Sweden	Yes	Yes	No	National standard format is yyyy-mm-dd. dd.mm.yyyy format is used in some places where it is required by EU regulations, for example for best-before dates on food and on driver's licenses. d/m format is used casually, when the year is obvious from the context, and for date ranges, e.g. 28-31/8 for 28–31 August. The textual format is "d mmmm yyyy" or "den d mmmm yyyy".	SS-ISO 8601
Switzerland	No	Yes	No	(dd.mm.yyyy or d. mmmm yyyy) for French, German, Italian and Romansh	SN ISO 8601:2005-08
Syria	No	Yes	No		
Taiwan	Yes	No	No	Short format: yyyy/(m)m/(d)d or yyyy-mm-dd Long format: yyyy年m月d日, in most context year is represented using ROC era system: 民國95年12月30日.	CNS 7648
Tajikistan	No	Yes	No	(dd.mm.yyyy)	
Tanzania	No	Yes	No		
Thailand	No	Yes	No	dd/mm/yyyy (in governmental sector with Buddhist Era years instead of Common Era)	TIS 1111:2535 in 1992
Togo	No	Yes	Yes	(dd/mm/yyyy) in French and (mm/dd/(yy)yy) in Ewe	
Tokelau	No	Yes	No		
Tonga	No	Yes	No		
Transnistria	Yes	Yes	No	yyyy-mm-dd dd.mm.yyyy (dd.mm.(yy)yy)	
Trinidad and Tobago	No	Yes	No		
Tunisia	No	Yes	No		
Turkey	No	Yes	No	Short format: dd.mm.yyyy Long format: d mmmm yyyy Full format: d mmmm yyyy dddd	
Turkmenistan	No	Yes	No	(dd.mm.(yy)yy ý.), yyyy-nji ýylyň d-nji mmmm	
Turks and Caicos Islands	No	Yes	No		
Tuvalu	No	Yes	No		
Uganda	No	Yes	No		
Ukraine	No	Yes	No	(dd.mm.(yy)yy; some cases of dd/mm/yyyy)	
United Arab Emirates	No	Yes	No		
United Kingdom	Yes	Yes	No	Most style guides follow the DMY convention by recommending d mmmm yyyy (sometimes written dd/mm/yyyy) format in articles (e.g. The Guardian's, and the Oxford Style Manual). Some newspapers use dddd mmmm d, yyyy for both the banner and articles, while others stick to DMY for both. In addition, YMD with four-digit year is used increasingly especially in applications associated with computers, and as per British standard BS ISO 8601:2019+A1:2022, avoiding the ambiguity of the numerical versions of the DMY/MDY formats.	8601:2019+A1:2022
United States Minor Outlying Islands	No	No	Yes	Same as the US	
United States	Sometimes	Rarely	Yes	(Civilian vernacular: m/d/yy or m/d/yyyy; other formats, especially d mmm(m) yyyy (but no numerically abbreviated DMY format) and yyyy-mm-dd (almost exclusively for that format; no abbreviated year and almost no abbreviated nor fully spelled month for alphanumeric YMD), are hardly prescribed or used—particularly in military, academic, scientific, computing, industrial, or governmental contexts. See Date and time notation in the United States.)	ANSI INCITS 30-1997 (R2008)
United States Virgin Islands	No	No	Yes		
Uruguay	No	Yes	No		
Uzbekistan	Yes	Yes	No	(dd.mm.yyyy Cyrillic, dd/mm yyyy Latin)	
Vanuatu	No	Yes	No		
Vatican City	Rarely	Yes	No	(dd m yyyy), with p.C.n. following (post Christum natum) if CE, and a.C.n. (ante Christum natum) if BCE. Likely from similar phrases used in ecclesiastical latin.	
Venezuela	No	Yes	No		
Vietnam	Yes	Yes	Sometimes	Long format: "Ngày (d)d tháng (m)m năm yyyy" (leading zeros required by Circular No. 01/2011/TT-BNV by the Ministry of Home Affairs) or ngày (d)d tháng (month in textform) năm yyyy. Short format (interchangeably): (d)d/(m)m/yyyy or (d)d-(m)m-yyyy; (d)d.(m)m.yyyy is also in use. In English documents: Short format: yyyy-mm-dd; Long format: mmmm d, yyyy; In historical documents: era names năm thứ _ tháng [m]m (or in textform) ngày(mồng) [d]d (or in textform).	
Wallis and Futuna	No	Yes	No		
Yemen	No	Yes	No		
Zambia	No	Yes	No		
Zimbabwe	No	Yes	No		

== See also ==
- Date and time representation by country
- Common Locale Data Repository, a database that covers national date and time notations
- ISO 8601
