= 5008 =

5008 may refer to:

- 5008 Miyazawakenji, a minor planet
- DIN 5008, German national standard DIN 5008 by Deutsches Institut für Normung (DIN) specifies writing and layout rules for word processing
- MicroRNA 5008, a protein
- Peugeot 5008, a 2009–present French compact MPV and SUV
- Zotye 2008, a 2005–2016 Chinese subcompact SUV, also sold as Zotye 5008
