= Date and time notation in Canada =

Date and time notation in Canada []
- Full date: English: 20 November 2026; November 20, 2026; French: 20 novembre 2026
- All-numeric date: 2026-11-20
- Time: 03:01; 3:01 a.m.

Date and time notation in Canada combines conventions from the United Kingdom, conventions from the United States, and conventions from France, often creating confusion. The Government of Canada specifies the ISO 8601 format for all-numeric dates (YYYY-MM-DD; for example, 2026-11-20). It recommends writing the time using the 24-hour clock (03:01) for maximum clarity in both Canadian English and Canadian French, but also allows the 12-hour clock (3:01 a.m.) in English.

== Date ==
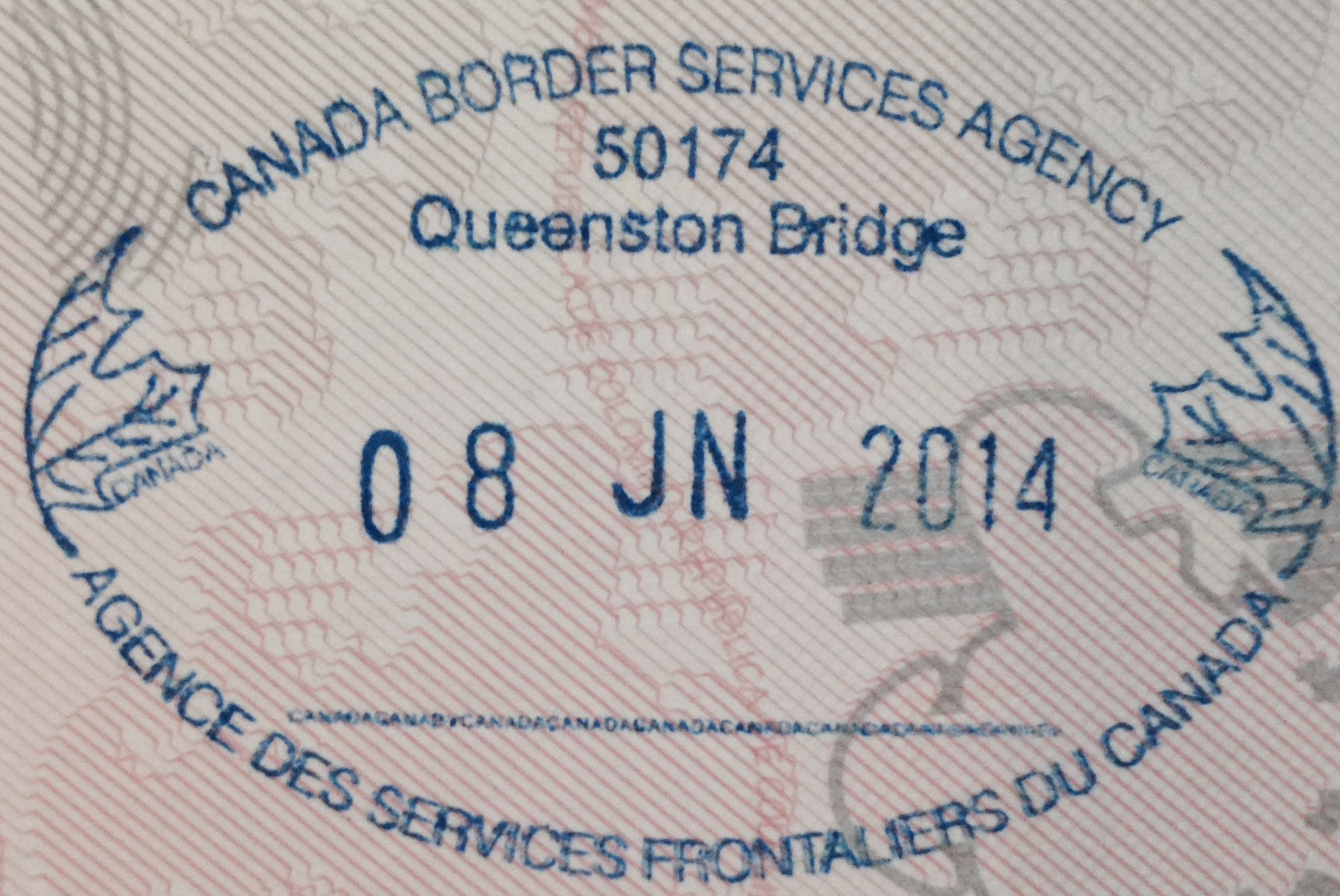
Canadian passport stamp from Queenston Bridge, showing the date 8 June 2014, with June written in Canada's bilingual two-letter code

When writing the full date, English speakers vacillate between the forms used in the United Kingdom (day first, "7 January") and United States (month first, "January 7"), depending on the region and context. French speakers consistently write the date with the day first ("le 7 janvier") like the rest of the French-speaking world. The government endorses all these forms when using words, but recommends only the ISO format for all-numeric dates to avoid error.

=== Dates in English ===
The date can be written either with the day or the month first in Canadian English, optionally with the day of the week. For example, the seventh day of January 2016 can be written as:

- Thursday, 7 January 2016 or Thursday, January 7, 2016
- 7 January 2016 or January 7, 2016
- 2016-01-07

Formal letters, academic papers, and reports often prefer the day-month-year sequence. Even in the United States, where the month-day-year sequence is even more prevalent, the Chicago Manual of Style recommends the day-month-year format for material that requires many full dates, since it does not require commas and has wider international recognition. Writing the date in this form is also useful for bilingual comprehension, as it matches the French sequence of writing the date. Documents with an international audience, including the Canadian passport, use the day-month-year format.

The date is sometimes written out in words, especially in formal documents such as contracts and invitations, following spoken forms:

- "… on this, the seventh day of January, two thousand and sixteen …"
- "… Thursday, the seventh of January, two thousand and sixteen …"
- informal: "… Thursday, January [the] seventh, twenty sixteen …"

=== Dates in French ===
French usage consistently places the day first when writing the full date. The standard all-numeric date format is common between English and French:

- [le] jeudi 7 janvier 2016
- [le] 7 janvier 2016
- 2016-01-07 (the hyphens can be replaced with non-breaking spaces or omitted)

The first day of the month is written with an ordinal indicator: le 1^{er} juillet 2017.

The definite article le is required in prose, except when including the day of the week in a date. When writing a date for administrative purposes (such as to date a document), one can write the date with or without the article.

=== All-numeric dates ===
The Government of Canada recommends that all-numeric dates in both English and French use the YYYY-MM-DD format codified in ISO 8601. The Standards Council of Canada also specifies this as the country's date format.

The YYYY-MM-DD format is the only officially recommended method of writing a numeric date in Canada. The presence of the DD/MM/YY (most of the world) and MM/DD/YY (American) formats often results in misinterpretation. Using these systems, the date 7 January 2016 could be written as either 07/01/16 or 01/07/16, which readers can also interpret as 1 July 2016 (or 1 July 1916); conversely, 2016-01-07 cannot be interpreted as another date.

In spite of its official status and broad usage, there is no binding legislation requiring the use of the YYYY-MM-DD format, and other date formats continue to appear in many contexts. For example, Payments Canada prefers ISO 8601, but allows cheques to be printed using any date format. Even some government forms, such as commercial cargo manifests, offer a blank line with no guidance. To remedy this, Daryl Kramp tabled a private member's bill directing courts on the interpretation of numeric dates by amending the Canada Evidence Act in 2011, which would effectively outlaw all numeric date formats other than YYYY-MM-DD. Todd Doherty revived this bill in 2015, but it did not progress beyond first reading before the end of the 42nd Canadian Parliament.

Federal regulations for shelf life dates on perishable goods mandate a year/month/day format, but allow the month to be written in full, in both official languages, or with a set of standardized two-letter bilingual codes, such as 2016 JA 07 or 16 JA 07. The year is required only if the date is beyond the current year, and can be written with two or four digits. These codes are occasionally found in other contexts, alongside other abbreviations specific to English or French.

Monthly bilingual symbols
Two-letter code	Month name in English	Month name in French
JA	January	janvier
FE	February	février
MR	March	mars
AL	April	avril
MA	May	mai
JN	June	juin
JL	July	juillet
AU	August	août
SE	September	septembre
OC	October	octobre
NO	November	novembre
DE	December	décembre

== Time ==
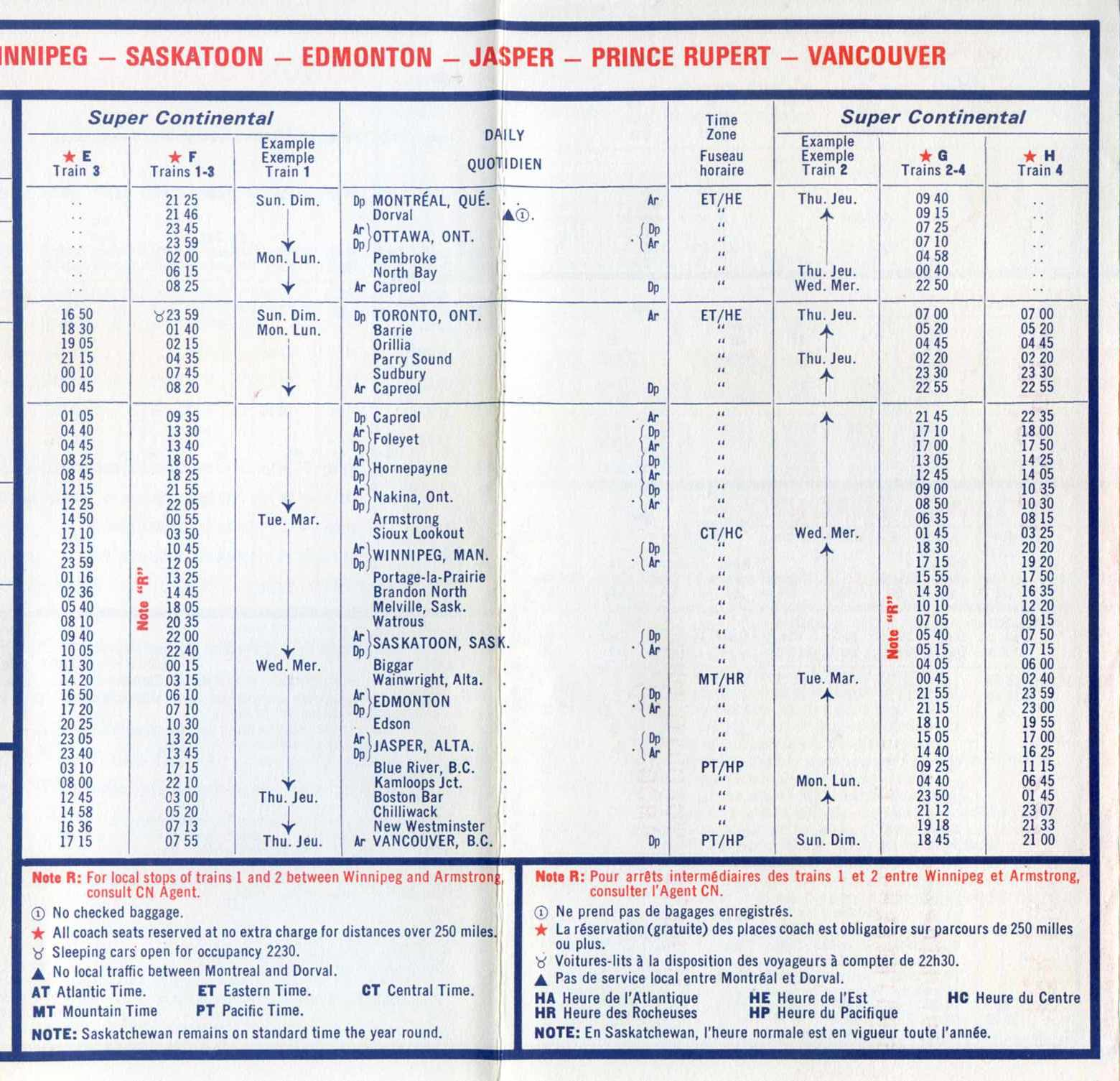
Canadian National timetable from 1975 using the 24-hour clock

Canada was an early adopter of the 24-hour clock, which Sandford Fleming promoted as key to accurate communication alongside time zones and a standard prime meridian. The Canadian Pacific Railway (CPR) began to use it in 1886, prior to its official adoption by European countries. The 24-hour notation is shorter, removes the potential for confusing the first and second halves of the day especially visible at midnight (00:00 or 24:00, 12:00 a.m.) and noon (12:00, 12:00 p.m.), and is language-neutral. English speakers use both the 24- and 12-hour clocks. While French speakers generally use the 24-hour clock, they tend to use both the 12-hour and the 24-hour clocks in informal oral communication.

=== Time in English ===
The Government of Canada recommends using the 24-hour clock to avoid ambiguity, and many industries require it. Fifteen minutes after eight o'clock at night can be written:

- 20:15
- 20:15:00
- 8:15 p.m.

The 24-hour clock is widely used in contexts such as transportation, medicine, environmental services, and data transmission, "preferable for greater precision and maximum comprehension the world over". Its use is mandatory in parts of the government as an element of the Federal Identity Program, especially in contexts such as signage where speakers of both English and French read the same text.

Outside the influence of government style, the 24-hour system is rarely used. The government describes the 24-hour system as "desirable" but does not enforce its use, meaning that the 12-hour clock remains common for oral and informal usage in English-speaking contexts. It is not the recommended style in journalism, for example. This situation is similar to the use of the 24-hour clock in the United Kingdom.

=== Time in French ===
Government communications in Canadian French list the time using 24-hour notation for all purposes. This is also the recommended style for journalism, but outside government and journalism, the 12-hour notation is also used when the time is written in words. The hours and minutes can be written with different separators depending on the context:

- 20 h 15
- 20:15 (tables, schedules, and other technical or bilingual uses)
- 2015 (an alternate style for 20:15)
