= Date and time notation in Asia =

== Post-Soviet states ==
=== Date ===
In the Post-Soviet states DD.MM.YYYY format is used with dot as a separator.

=== Time ===
24-hour time notation is used officially and for purposes that require precision like announcements in the media. In colloquial speech 12-hour clock is used.

== Greater China ==
=== Date ===
The date format follows the Chinese hierarchical system, which has traditionally been big-endian. Consequently, it correlates with ISO 8601 — year first, month next, and day last (e.g. 2006-01-29). A leading zero is optional in practice, but is mostly not used. Chinese characters that mean year, month, and day are often used as separators (e.g. 2006年1月29日). Since the characters clearly label the date, the year may be abbreviated to two digits when this format is used.

An exception to this guideline is in Taiwan, where a separate calendar system is used, with years numbered to the founding of the Republic of China in 1912. Thus, the year 2006 corresponds to the "95th year of the Republic" (or Chinese: 民國95年; pinyin: Mínguó 95). In official contexts, this system is always used, while the Gregorian calendar is sometimes used in informal contexts. To avoid confusion, the Gregorian year is always written out in full in Taiwan. For example, 95.01.29 refers to 2006-01-29, not 1995-01-29 (which would be rendered as 84.01.29). Another means to distinguish between the two systems is to place the terms Gōngyuán (公元, common era) and Mínguó (民國, Republic) before the year. For example: 2006 is rendered as either 公元2006年 or 民國95年.

The day of the week is often appended to the date and commonly enclosed in parentheses, such as 2006年1月29日 (星期日).

In speech, the date is spoken in the same format as it is written.

2006(èrlínglíngliù) 年(nián) 1(yī) 月(yuè) 29(èrshíjiǔ) 日(rì) 星期日(xīngqírì)

Hào (號) is a colloquial term used to express the day of the month instead of rì (日). It can also be used by news presenters in Chinese language, but is rarely used in formal writing.

2006(èrlínglíngliù) 年(nián) 1(yī) 月(yuè) 29(èrshíjiǔ) 號(hào) 星期日(xīngqírì)

Hào is more often used when the month is understood from the context, i.e.: 29號 for the 29th.

In informal speech, Chinese speakers expressing the date only with month and day may neglect hào (號)/rì (日) when the number of the day is more than ten, i.e.: 1月29號/1月29日 will sometimes be spoken like 1月29, but 1月9號/1月9日 will not be simplified to 1月9.

Dates written in Hong Kong and Macau are often formatted in the DD.MM.YYYY style due to European influences. Nonetheless, the Chinese form of the dates is still read in the same way as described above. Visas for the People's Republic of China also conform to this format.

=== Time ===
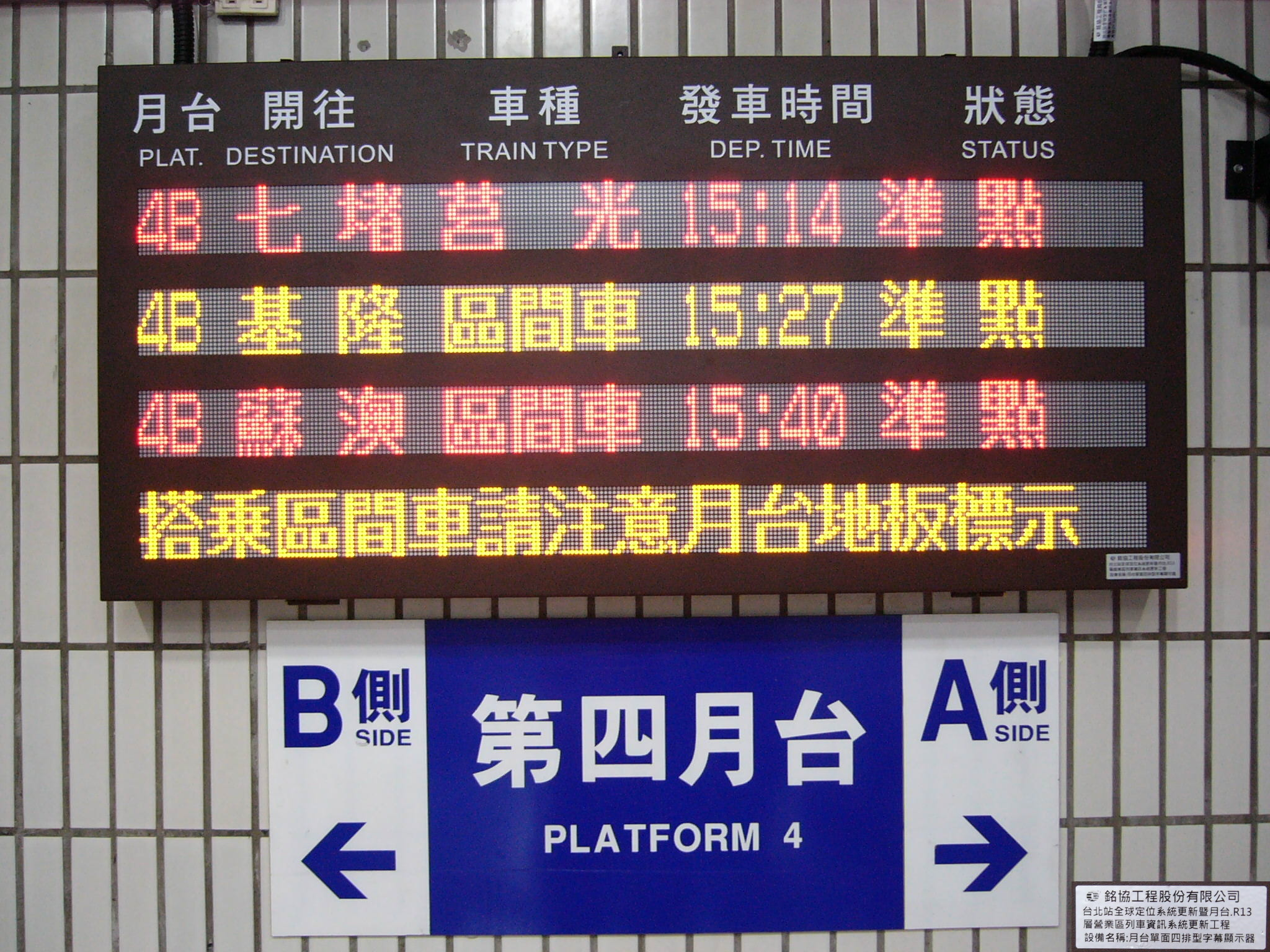
4-line LED display at Platform 4, Taiwan Railway Taipei Station

It is not uncommon to see Chinese numerals instead of Arabic numbers, but tourist attractions will usually use Arabic numerals for the convenience of foreigners.

Chinese characters that mean hour (时; 時; shí) and minute (分; fēn) are sometimes used instead of the standard colon, as in 19時45分; shíjiǔ shí sìshíwǔ fēn, literally "nineteen hours, forty-five minutes".

Diǎn(点; 點) is a variation of shí and typically used in speech and often in informal writing, such as 19點; shíjiǔ diǎn.

Zhèng (正) or zhěng (整) is used after shí to mean exactly on the hour, like 19時正/19時整 meaning "[exactly] 19:00" or "19 o'clock [sharp]".

Zhōng (钟; 鐘), which literally means "clock", can be added to a time phrase, usually to mean on the hour (such as 7點鐘; qī diǎnzhōng, "7 o'clock [sharp]" which can also be spoken and written as 7時正/7時整) or a time period of minutes (such as 12分鐘; shí'èr fēnzhōng, "twelve minutes long").

If the minutes of a given time are less than ten, the preceding zero (零; líng) is included in speech. The time 08:05 would be read as bādiǎn língwǔfēn; 'eight hours zero-five minutes', similar to how English speakers would describe the same time as "eight oh-five".

Both the 12-hour and 24-hour notations are used in spoken and written Chinese. To avoid confusion, time on schedules and public notices are typically formatted in the 24-hour system, so the times 19:45 and 07:45 are understood to be 12 hours apart from each other. Spoken Chinese predominantly uses the 12-hour system and follows the same concept as A.M. (上午; shàngwǔ) and P.M. (下午; xiàwǔ). However, these clarifying words precede the time. For example, 19:45 would be written as 下午7:45; xiàwǔ qī shí sìshíwǔ ("after noon seven hours forty-five") or 下午7點45分; xiàwǔ qī diǎn sìshíwǔ fēn ("after noon seven hours forty-five minutes"). Time written in the 24-hour system can be read as is, so 19:45 is read as shíjiǔdiǎn sìshíwǔfēn; 'nineteen hours', 'forty-five minutes'.

A sample of other phrases that are often used to better describe the time-frame of day are listed below:

Chinese	Pinyin	Meaning	Time period covered
凌晨	língchén	approaching morning/dawn	Midnight to before dawn
早上	zǎoshàng	morning	Dawn to about 9:00 or 10:00
上午	shàngwǔ	day before noon	Dawn to 11:59; Also used in computer systems (e.g. Windows) to denote "a.m."
中午; 正午	zhōngwǔ; zhèngwǔ	midday; noon	11:00 to 12:59
下午	xiàwǔ	day after noon	13:00 to before dusk Also used in computer systems (e.g. Windows) to denote "p.m."
傍晚	bàngwǎn	approaching evening/night	Dusk to about 19:00
晚上	wǎnshàng	evening/night	18:00 to midnight

- 03:00
  - 淩晨3點; língchén sān diǎn (literally "pre-dawn 3 hours", meaning "3 in the morning")
  - 淩晨3點鐘; língchén sān diǎnzhōng (literally "pre-dawn 3 o'clock", meaning "3 o'clock in the morning")
- 19:00
  - 晚上7點; wǎnshàng qī diǎn (literally "evening 7 hours", meaning "7 at night")
  - 晚上7點鐘; wǎnshàng qī diǎnzhōng (literally "evening 7 o'clock", meaning "7 o'clock at night")

Note: As in English, these time-frame phrases are used only with the 12-hour system.

Time can alternatively be expressed as a fraction of the hour. A traditional Chinese unit of time, the kè (刻), was 1/96 of the 24-hour day, equivalent mathematically to 15 minutes and semantically to the English "quarter of an hour". A quarter-after is thus yī kè (一刻; 'one kè') or guò yī kè (過一刻; 'one kè past'). A quarter-to is chà yī kè (差一刻; 'one kè less'), or more commonly, sān kè (三刻; 'three kè'). "At the half-hour" is described using bàn (半), which means half.

- 6:45
  - 6點三刻; liù diǎn sān kè; 'six hours', 'three kè'
  - 7點差一刻; qī diǎn chà yī kè; 'seven hours one kè less'; or 差一刻7點; chà yī kè qī diǎn; 'one kè less seven hours'
- 8:15
  - 8點一刻; bādiǎn duō yīkè; 'eight hours', 'plus one kè'
- 9:30
  - 9點半; jiǔdiǎn bàn; 'nine hours half'

Attention must be drawn to the time 02:00. It is written as èr shí (2時) but is almost always read as liǎng diǎn (兩點). The number two, èr (二), takes the form of liǎng (兩) when followed by a measure word, in this case, diǎn (點). Note that this does not apply to either 12:00. Noon is shí èr diǎnzhōng (12點鐘; '12 o'clock'); zhèngwǔ (正午; 'midday'); or wǔshí (午時; 'wǔ hour'). Midnight, on the other hand, is língchén shí èr diǎnzhōng (淩晨12點鐘; 'pre-dawn 12 o'clock') or língdiǎn/língshí (零點/零時; 'zero hour').

Cantonese has an additional method of expressing time as a fraction of the hour. This system divides the hour into 12 units, each five minutes long. Each unit, therefore, corresponds to one of the numbers written on an analogue clock. The character for this unit is uncertain since it is only used in speech, however the Cantonese pronunciation is ji6 and homonymous to the Mandarin pronunciation of 字, zì. This method can be used in two ways - with the relative hour and without. When the relative hour is included, the unit must be preceded with the measure word 個 (Jyutping: go3; pinyin: ge). Example: 3:05 is 3點1個字 (saam1 dim2 yat1 go3 ji6; sāndiǎn yīgezì), usually simply 3點1. When the relative hour is not included, the unit is omitted as well; the position of the minute hand is described instead, using the verb 踏 (daap6; tà), which literally means "step on", meaning "resting on top of" in this context. Examples:

five-after = 踏1 (daap6 yat1; tà yī)
ten-after = 踏2 (daap6 yi6; tà èr)
fifteen-to = 踏9 (daap6 gau2; tà jiǔ)
ten-to = 踏10 (daap6 sap6; tà shí)

The half-hour mark is never described using this unit of five minutes, however. 3:30 is still 3點半 (saam1 dim2 bun3; sāndiǎn bàn), as previously described. Half-past the hour is 踏半 (daap6 bun3; tàbàn).

== Southeast Asia ==
- Date and time notation in the Philippines
- Date and time notation in Thailand
- Date and time notation in Vietnam
