= Date and time notation in Europe =

The European Committee for Standardization (CEN) and (CENELEC) adopted ISO 8601 with EN 28601, now EN ISO 8601. As a European Norm, CEN and CENELEC member states are obligated to adopt the standard as national standard without alterations as well.

Except for Austria, Germany and Switzerland, see the navigation box on the bottom to find individual articles per country.

== European Commission ==
Official EU documents still tend to use DD.MM.YYYY but one document specifies the use of ISO 8601: "Dates should be formatted by the following format: YYYY-MM-DD."

== Post-Soviet states ==
=== Date ===
In most post-Soviet states DD.MM.YYYY format is used with dots as separators and with leading zeros.

Some, such as Lithuania, have adopted the ISO 8601 YYYY-MM-DD format; previously a mixed standard with ISO 8601 order but dots as separators was in use.

=== Time ===
24-hour time notation is used officially and for purposes that require precision like announcements in the media. In colloquial speech, the 12-hour clock is also used in some places / countries.

== Austria, Germany, Switzerland ==
=== Date ===
The traditional all-numeric form of writing Gregorian dates in German is the little-endian day.month.year order, using a dot on the line (period or full stop) as the separator (e.g., "15.04.1974" or "15.4.74"). Years could be written with two or four digits; the century was sometimes seen being replaced by an apostrophe: "31.12.'91"; however, two-digit years are generally deprecated after the Millennium. Numbers may be written with or without leading zero in Austria or Switzerland, where they are commonly only discarded in days when literal months are being used (e.g., "09.11.", but "9. November"). There should always be a space after a dot: The use of a dot as a separator matches the convention of pronouncing the day and the month as an ordinal number, because ordinal numbers are written in German followed by a dot. German grammar rules do not allow leading zeros in dates, however leading zeros were allowed according to machine writing standards if they helped aligning dates. In Germany, it is not uncommon in casual speech to use numbers to refer to months, rather than their names (e.g. der zweite erste – "the second first" – for 2 January).

Besides that, in Hungary the big-endian year-month-day order has been traditionally used. In 1995, also in Germany, the traditional notation was replaced in the DIN 5008 standard, which defines common typographic conventions, with the ISO 8601 notation (e.g., "1991-12-31"), and is becoming the prescribed date format in Germany since 1996-05-01. The latter is beginning to become more popular, especially in IT-related work and international projects. Since portions of the population continued to use the old format, the traditional format was re-introduced as alternative to the standard yyyy-mm-dd format to DIN 5008 in 2001 and DIN ISO 8601 in September 2006 but its usage is restricted to contexts where misinterpretation cannot occur. The expanded form of the date (e.g., 31. Dezember 1991) continues to use the little-endian order and the ordinal-number dot for the day of the month.

Week numbers according to ISO 8601 and the convention of starting the week on Monday were introduced in the mid 1970s (DIN 1355). These conventions have been widely adhered to by German calendar publishers since then. Week numbers are prominently printed in calendars and are widely used in the business world: It is common to hear people say, for example, "I'm still free in week 36" or to have a company write "We expect delivery in week 49". Especially in business communication, written or spoken, it is common to use week numbers with the abbreviation "KW", standing for Kalenderwoche ("calendar week"), so that in German the last example would be expressed as "Wir erwarten die Lieferung in der 49. KW" or "Wir erwarten die Lieferung in KW 49" ("We expect the delivery in the forty-ninth [calendar week]" and "[…] in calendar week 49").

Broadcasting continues an older convention of starting weeks on Saturdays, two days before the DIN 1355 week.

In Germany and eastern Europe weekday names are commonly (and according to DIN 1355) abbreviated with two letters (Mo, Di, Mi, Do, Fr, Sa, So), whereas month names (rather than month numbers) are abbreviated with three letters (Jan, Feb, Mrz, Apr, Mai, Jun, Jul, Aug, Sep, Okt, Nov, Dez).

=== Time ===
In written German, time is expressed almost exclusively in the 24-hour notation (00:00–23:59), using either a colon or a dot on the line as the separators between hours, minutes, and seconds – e.g. 14:51 or 14.51. The standard separator in Germany (as laid down in DIN 1355, DIN 5008) was the dot. In 1995 this was changed to the colon in the interest of compatibility with ISO 8601. The traditional representation with a dot remains in widespread use, however, and in this format leading zeros are generally omitted from the hours; additionally, the literal string "Uhr" is frequently added – e.g. 6.30 Uhr. Just as with the date format, leading zeros appear to be less commonly used in Germany than in Austria and Switzerland although the Austrian Standard ÖNORM recommends the zero for table-form dates only – such as Abfahrt 08:30 Uhr – and not for running text.

In spoken language, the 24-hour clock has become the dominant form during the second half of the 20th century, especially for formal announcements and exact points in time. Systematic use of the 24-hour clock by German radio and TV announcers, along with the proliferation of digital clocks, may have been a significant factor in this development. In German-speaking Switzerland, only the 12-hour clock is used in everyday speech.

A variant of the 12-hour clock is also used, in particular in informal speech for approximate times. On some radio stations, announcers regularly give the current time on both forms, as in "Es ist jetzt vierzehn Uhr einundfünfzig; neun Minuten vor drei" ("It is now fourteen fifty-one; nine minutes to three").

There are two variants of the 12-hour clock used in spoken German regarding quarterly fractions of the current hour. One always relates to the next full hour, in other words, it names the fraction of the currently passing hour. For example, "dreiviertel drei" (three-quarter three, see table below) stands for "three quarters of the third hour have passed" or 14:45.

The other variant is relative; this one is also used for multiples of five minutes.

Time	Absolute	Relative	24-hour clock
14:00	"zwei Uhr/zwei/um zwei" (two o'clock/two/at two)		"vierzehn Uhr" (fourteen o'clock)
14:05		"fünf nach zwei" (five past two)	"vierzehn Uhr fünf" (fourteen o'clock five)
14:10		"zehn nach zwei" (ten past two)	"vierzehn Uhr zehn" (fourteen o'clock ten)
14:15	"viertel drei" (quarter three)	"viertel nach zwei" "viertel über zwei" (quarter past two)	"vierzehn Uhr fünfzehn" (fourteen o'clock fifteen)
14:20		"zwanzig nach zwei" (twenty past two) / "zehn vor halb drei" (ten to half three)	"vierzehn Uhr zwanzig" (fourteen o'clock twenty)
14:25		"fünf vor halb drei" (five to half three)	"vierzehn Uhr fünfundzwanzig" (fourteen o'clock twenty-five)
14:30	"halb drei" (half three)		"vierzehn Uhr dreißig" (fourteen o'clock thirty) / "vierzehn dreißig" (fourteen thirty)
14:35		"fünf nach halb drei" (five past half three)	"vierzehn Uhr fünfunddreißig" (fourteen o'clock thirty-five)
14:40		"zwanzig vor drei" (twenty to three) / "zehn nach halb drei" (ten past half three)	"vierzehn Uhr vierzig" (fourteen o'clock forty)
14:45	"dreiviertel drei" (three-quarter three)	"viertel vor/auf drei" (quarter to three)	"vierzehn Uhr fünfundvierzig" (fourteen o'clock forty-five)
14:50		"zehn vor drei" (ten to three)	"vierzehn Uhr fünfzig" (fourteen o'clock fifty)
14:55		"fünf vor drei" (five to three)	"vierzehn Uhr fünfundfünfzig" (fourteen o'clock fifty-five)
15:00	"drei Uhr/drei/um drei" (three o'clock/three/at three)		"fünfzehn Uhr" (fifteen o'clock)

The relative phrases are exclusive to the 12-hour clock, just as the "(hour) Uhr (minutes)" format is exclusive to the 24-hour clock. For hours greater than 12 and non-zero minutes, "Uhr" is sometimes omitted, especially for the half hours between 13:30 and 19:30.

The controversy between the "absolute" and "relative" ways of giving the time is largely one of regional dialect differences: the "relative" variant (as in "viertel/Viertel vor/auf drei") is the much more common one as it is used in a wide diagonal strip from Hamburg to Switzerland, leaving some of the German south-west and most of eastern Germany as well as the eastern half of Austria with the "absolute" variant (as in "dreiviertel drei" or "drei Viertel drei"). For half-hours, the absolute form as in "halb zwei" is used everywhere. The term controversy may be appropriate insofar as "relativists" often complain about not being able to decode the "absolute" way of telling the time, resulting in missed appointments etc. The same way of giving the time is used also in Hungary and Slovenia (of course using the local language) perhaps as the remnant of the old Austro-Hungarian times.

== See also ==
- ISO 8601 usage
- Date format by country
- Subtractive notation
