= Date and time notation in the Philippines =

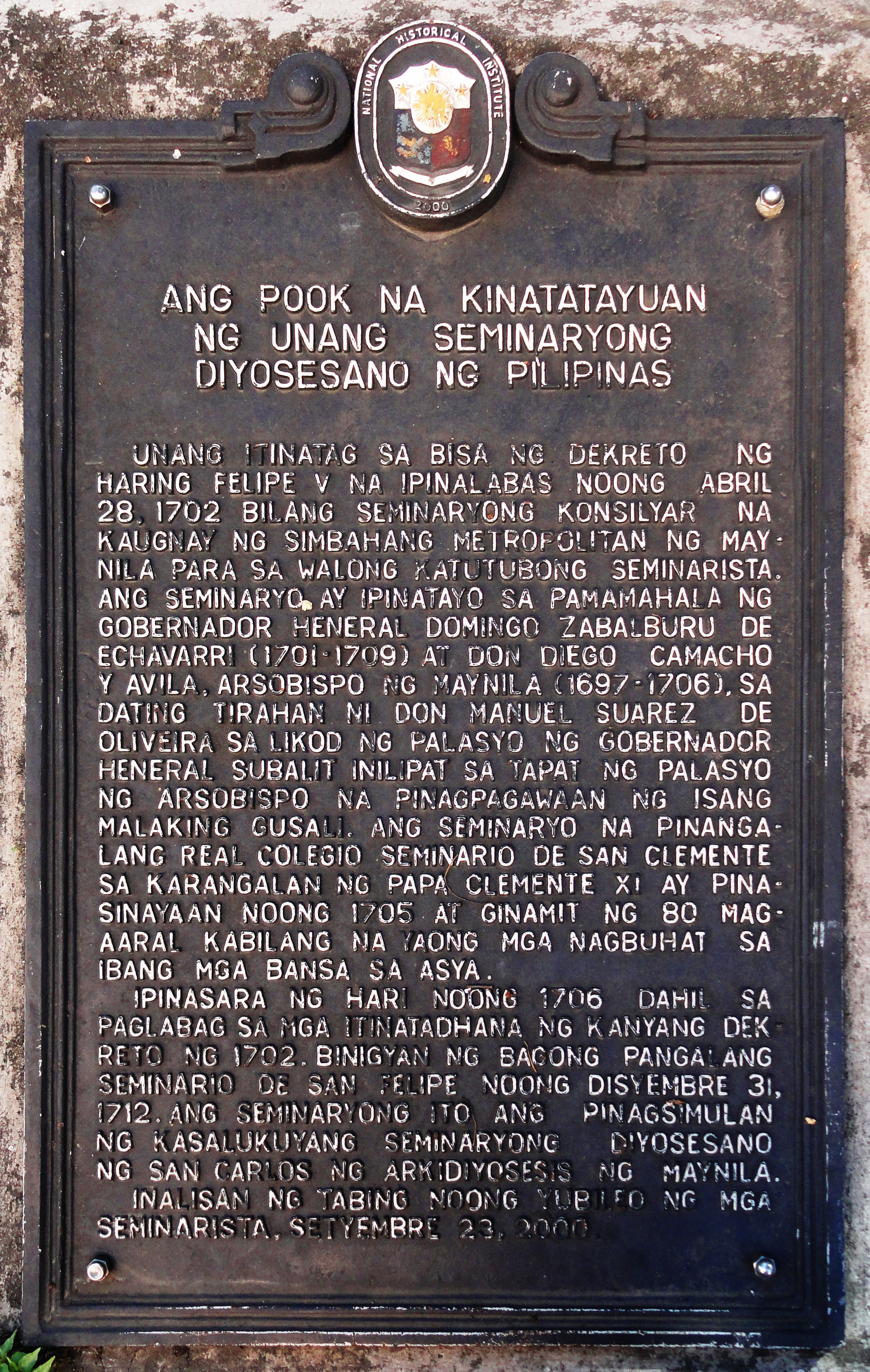
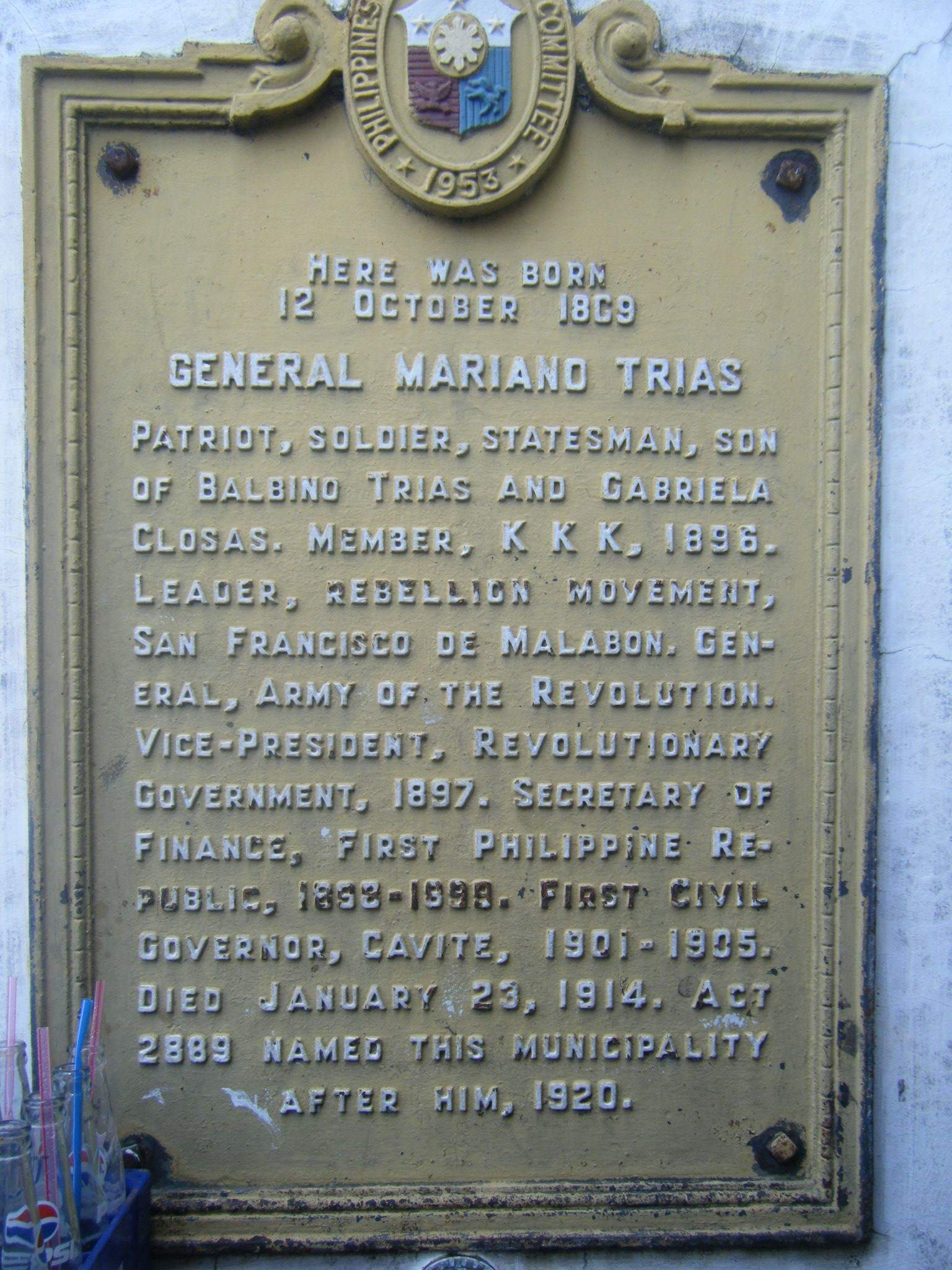
Two historical markers with varying date formats in Filipino (left, using MDY format) and English (right, using both MDY and DMY formats).

Date and time notation in the Philippines varies across the country in various, customary formats. By default in English, Filipinos comprehend and tell the date in the middle-endian order (month-day-year; MDY for brevity) and the time in 12-hour format. Some government agencies and civil institutions in the Philippines have adopted 24-hour time and date notation based on the international ISO 8601 and little-endian order (day-month-year; DMY for brevity), notably the Philippines driver's license and the Unified Multi-Purpose ID.

However, in Tagalog and all other Philippine languages, the DMY notation is the standard format, as adapted from the Spanish.

== Date ==
In casual settings, as a legacy of US rule in the early 20th century, alphanumeric date formats are usually written with a middle-endian (MDY) order in a way similar to that of the United States, and has since become the de facto standard date format in the country. Another format, the little-endian order (DMY), similar way to that of United Kingdom, is applied primarily by most government institutions, military and police forces, although it is also used for more formal civil uses such as a number of tertiary-level (especially NCAA and UAAP) educational institutions (especially as well in graduate and post-graduate institutions), business correspondences and databases for companies that do not deal with East Asian or North American clients. Other applications of the little-endian format include certificates, plaques, trophies, and expiration dates.

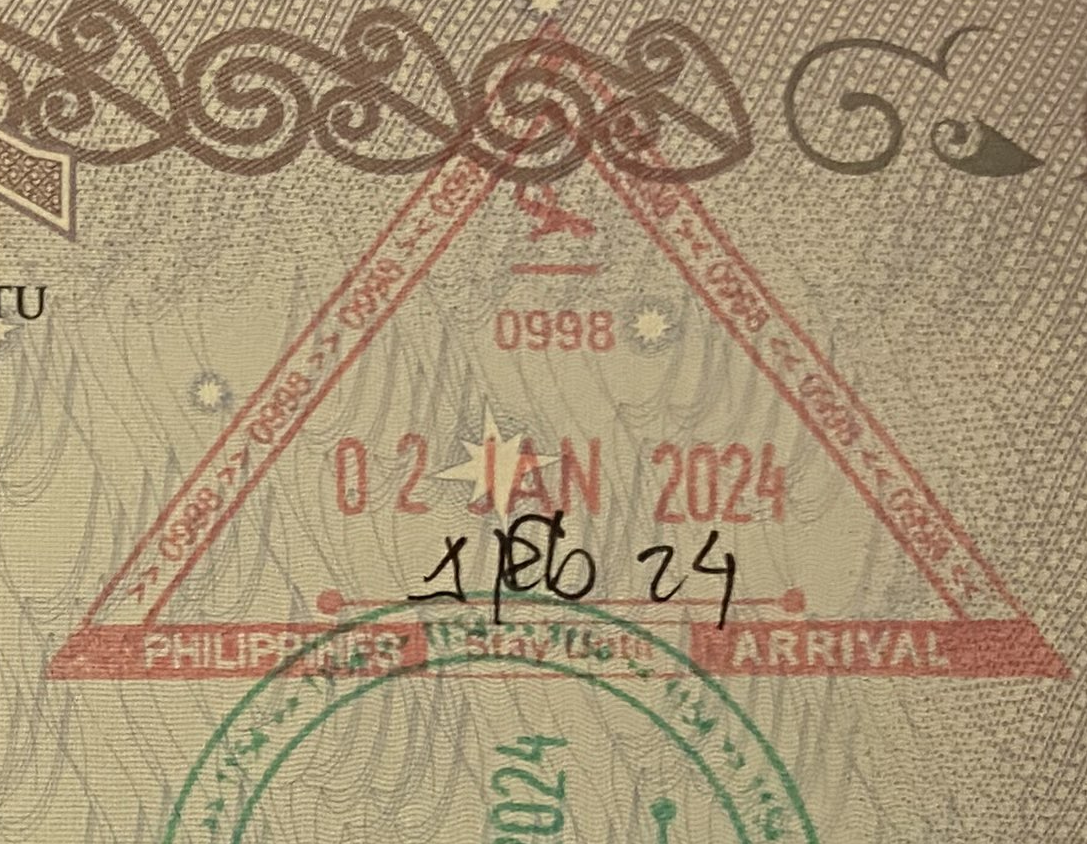
Philippine arrival stamp in DD-MMM-YYYY format

There is no law mandating the date order, minimum or maximum length, or format (i.e. alphanumeric or numeric), and notations highly vary widely from office to office, in private and public sectors. For example, passports issued by the Department of Foreign Affairs, which particularly notates the date alphanumerically as DD-MMM-YYYY as are the arrival and departure inked passport stamps issued by the Bureau of Immigration as of c. 2024. Legislative bills, executive orders, written correspondences and memoranda emanating from government bureaus are dated alphanumerically with a D-MMMM-YYYY format (switching from MMMM-D-YYYY roughly during c. the Noynoy Aquino administration). Dates on cheques Issued after 1 May 2024 are required to be written in the MM-DD-YYYY format.

The big-endian order (year-month-day) format is very hardly encountered in the country and has its very own niche use in the country, including and especially those needing compliance to the ISO 8601 standard. In practice, driver's license issued by the Land Transportation Office and the UMID issued by the Social Security System, Government Service Insurance System, Philippine Health Insurance Corporation, and Home Development Mutual Fund uses the ISO 8601 standard and notates the date numerically as YYYY-MM-DD.

The little-endian (DMY) date format is always written alphanumerically by default to avoid confusion. While this date format was already in use (infrequently but less dominantly than MDY), it has enigmatically proliferated in usage roughly around c. 2010s in nearly all formal and/or official letters/correspondences, (written) memos, technical writings, legal and professional settings. (The only quirk, however, is that dates on the body of the letter are still written in full alphanumeric MDY format).

The forward slash (/) is the most common separator for a numeric date format. The use of hyphen (-) was formerly ubiquitous (alongside the forward slash) but has since been seldomly encountered, while periods (.) used to be infrequently used but are now almost exclusively used for expiration dates that are normally written in the alphanumeric (DMY) format. On the other hand, an alphanumeric date in month-day-year format needs to use a comma and spacing between the day and year. The day-month-year variant does not need a comma between the month and year.

Below are date format variations typically used in the Philippines:

Format	Order	Current date
Alphanumeric	MMM(M)-DD-YYYY	October 24, 2026
Alphanumeric	MMM(M)-D-YYYY	October 24, 2026
Alphanumeric	DD-(M)MMM-YYYY	24 October 2026
Alphanumeric	D-(M)MMM-YYYY	24 October 2026
Numeric	MM-DD-YYYY	10-24-2026
Numeric	M-D-YYYY	10-24-2026
Numeric	MM-DD-YY	10-24-26

Standard: October 24, 2026 or month day, year. This is the most common and preferred date format in use by the Filipino people in general.

The following date format variations are less commonly or seldomly used:

Format	Order	Example
Numeric	M-D-YY	10-24-26
Numeric	DD-MM-YYYY	24-10-2026
Numeric	D-M-YYYY	24-10-2026
Numeric	DD-MM-YY	24-10-26
Numeric	D-M-YY	24-10-26
Numeric	YYYY-MM-DD	2026-10-24

In Tagalog and all other Philippine languages, however, the day-month-year notation is the format as adapted from the Spanish. The ordinal prefix ika- is applied on the day first as in ika-24 ng Oktubre 2026 (English: 24 October 2026).

== Time ==
Also inherited from the US (as a legacy of US rule) is the default way of time-telling in the country. The Philippines uses the 12-hour clock format in all oral and almost all written communication, whether formal or informal. A colon (:) is used to separate the hour from the minutes (1:58 PM). The use of the 24-hour clock is usually restricted in use among airports, the military, police, and other technical purposes.

Aside from the 12-hour clock, the Philippines also uses the 24-hour clock format, which some Filipinos prefer for personal use. Smartwatches sold in the country are typically programmed to display the 24-hour format by default. Likewise, smartphones, laptops, and personal computers can be set to either the 12-hour or 24-hour format, depending on the user’s preference. However, despite the availability and use of the 24-hour format on devices, Filipinos generally continue to pronounce and express time using the 12-hour format in everyday conversation.

== Spoken conventions ==
Numerical elements of dates and the time may pronounced using either their Spanish names or vernacular ones; the former is somewhat pedestrian while the latter tends to be longer, formal and academic.

Examples:

Date: 1 April 2022

- Spanish-derived: Abril (a-)uno/primero, dos mil bente-dos or (a-/ika-/aka)uno ng Abril, dos mil bente-dos (Spanish: Uno de Abril, dos mil veintidos)
- English: April one, twenty twenty-two or April one, two thousand twenty-two
- Tagalog: Ika-isa(ng/na araw) ng Abril, (taong) dalawang libo('t/ at) dalawampu't dalawa or Abril (ika-)isa, (taong) dalawang libo('t/ at) dalawampu't dalawa

Time: 8:30 PM / 20:30

- Spanish-derived: Alas otso y med'ya/mediya ng gabi (Spanish: A las ocho y media; note ng gabi as vernacular designation for in the evening)
- English: half past eight (in the evening) or Eight Thirty (P.M./in the evening/at night)
- Tagalog: Tatlumpu(ng) (minuto/sandali) makalipas ang ikawalo (ng gabi) or (ika)walo at tatlumpu(ng) minuto ng gabi or (ika)walo't kalahati ng gabi

Times of day ending in :00 minutes is pronounced as the numbered hour followed by o'clock (e.g., 3:00 as three o'clock, 11:00 as eleven o'clock, 7:00 as seven o'clock, etc.). This may be followed by the AM or PM designator, or might not be, if obvious. O'clock itself may be omitted, leaving a time such as eight AM or four PM. Instead of "AM" and "PM", times can also be described as "in the morning", "in the afternoon", "in the evening", or "at night". Minutes :01 through :09 are usually pronounced as o'one through o'nine; :10 through :59 are their usual number-words (especially for times past half the hour). For example, "9:45 AM" is usually pronounced "nine forty-five" or sometimes "nine forty-five AM". Times of day from :31 to :59 are spoken with their usual number-words and is the typical way of time-telling among the general public. The subtractive way of telling the time (when the time is past half the hour) is usually reserved for more formal conversations, Tagalog and Philippine languages, and "globalized" English speakers. For example:

Time: 3:45 PM / 15:45

- Spanish-derived: Alas tres (y) cuarenta cinco ng hapon
- English: (a) quarter to four (in the afternoon) or Three-forty-five (P.M./in the afternoon)
- Tagalog: Labinlimang minuto bago ang ika-apat ng hapon

(Note that Tagalog and all other Philippine languages DOES NOT tell the time past half the hour with number-words as that is very odd and tantamount to wrong grammar. Instead, the time is told the subtractive way from the upcoming hour)

The following table shows times written in some common approaches to 12-hour and 24-hour notation, and how each time is typically spoken:

12-hour	24-hour	Spoken
12:00 AM; 12 midnight	0:00	midnight ikalabindalawa ng hatinggabi alas dose ng hatinggabi
6:05 AM	6:05	five past six six o'five; six five limang minuto makalipas ang ika-anim ng umaga alas sais singko ng umaga
9:18 AM	9:18	eighteen minutes past nine nine eighteen labingwalong minuto makalipas ang ikasiyam ng umaga alas nuwebe disiotso ng umaga
11:15 AM	11:15	quarter past eleven eleven fifteen labinlimang minuto makalipas ang ikalabing-isa ng umaga alas onse kinse ng umaga
12:00 PM; 12 noon	12:00	noon twelve o'clock ikalabindalawa ng tanghali alas dose ng tanghali
4:30 PM	16:30	half past four four thirty tatlumpung minuto makalipas ang ika-apat ng hapon alas kuwatro y medya ng hapon
5:38 PM	17:38	twenty-two minutes to six five thirty-eight dalawampu't dalawang minuto bago mag ika-anim ng gabi alas singko trenta y otso ng hapon
10:35 PM	22:35	twenty-five to eleven ten thirty-five dalawampu't limang minuto bago mag ikalabing-isa ng gabi alas diyes trenta y singko ng gabi

== See also ==
- Date and time representation by country
- Internationalization and localization
- Philippine Standard Time
