= Date and time notation in Ireland =

== Date ==
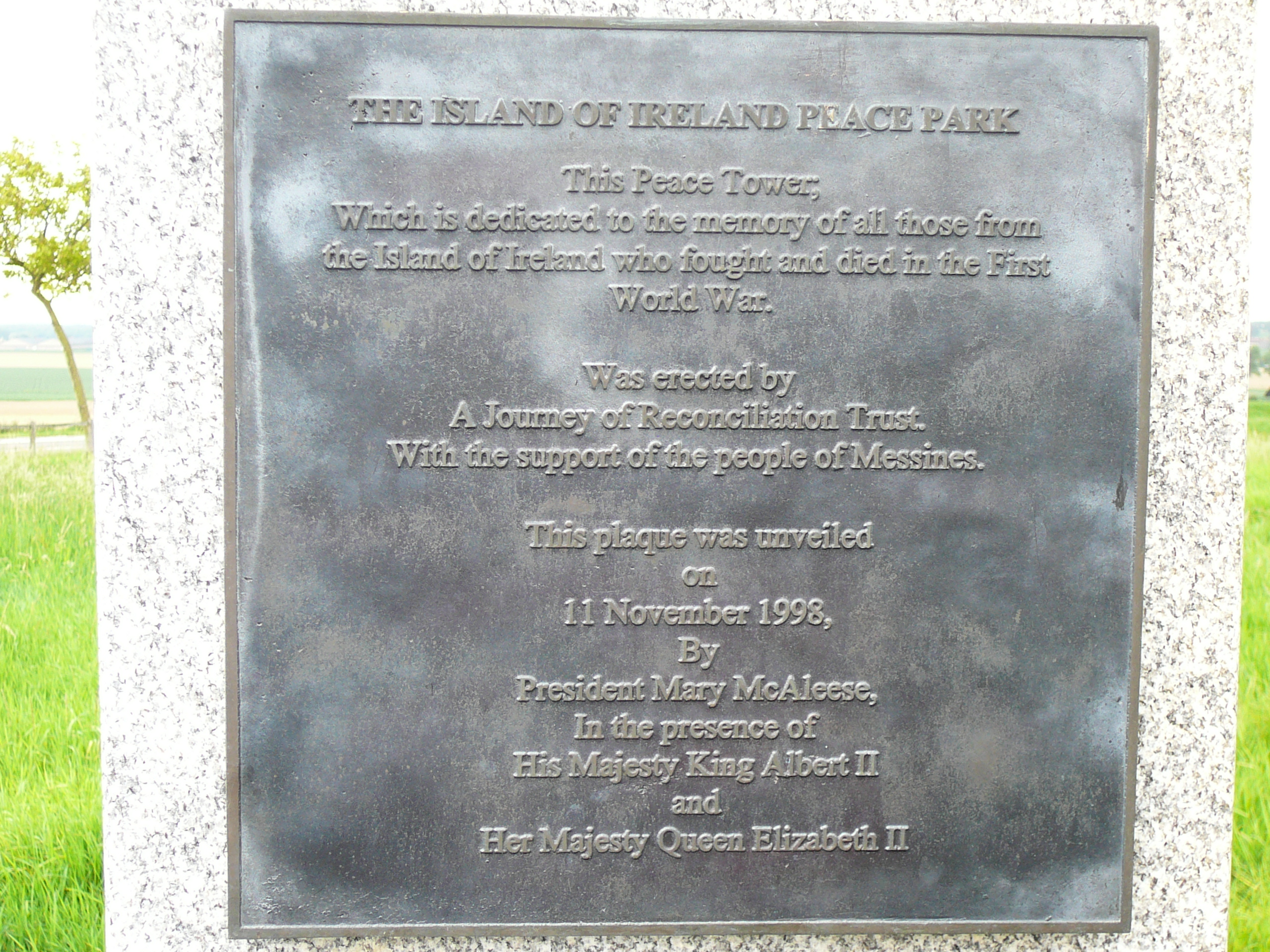
Plaque at the Island of Ireland Peace Park, with date in "DD Month YYYY" format.

In Ireland, the date is written in the order "day month year". The separator varies (cf,)

31 December 1992 is also used, or in Irish, 31 Nollaig 1992. When dates are spoken, they are generally given in "day month year" order: "the 31st of December 1992", or sometimes in "month day year": "December the 31st 1992". Ordinal indicators may also be used (31st December 1992; 22nd April 1953, etc.). In Irish, these are 1^{d} (short for chéad), 2^{a} (short for dara), with all subsequent digits followed by -ú.

Weeks are generally referred to by the date on which they start, with Monday often treated as the first day of the week, for example "the week commencing 10 August", although some calendars give Sunday as the first day of the week.

== Time ==
The 12-hour clock is the dominant format in Ireland, although the 24-hour clock is gaining in use. In the Irish language, the 12-hour clock is used. The abbreviation a.m. is used, but it stands for ar maidin ("in the morning") rather than ante meridiem. Times after 12:00 are described as (for example) 3:00 i.n., short for iarnóin (afternoon).

Examples:

- 2:00 is said as "two o'clock", "two", or "two (o'clock) in the afternoon". In Irish it is "a dó a chlog".
- 2:01 - 14:14 and 14:16 - 14:29 is said as "... past two". In Irish it is "... tar éis a dó" (in Uladh (Ulster Irish) “‘’… i ndiaidh a dó’’”)
- 2:15 is said as "a quarter past two". In Irish it is "ceathrú tar éis a dó".
- 2:30 is said as "half past two" or "half two". In Irish it is "leathuair tar éis a dó".
- 2:31 - 14:45 and 14:46 - 14:59 is said as "... to three". In Irish it is "... chun a trí" (in Uladh (Ulster Irish)“‘’…go dtí a trí’’”)
- 2:45 is said as "a quarter to three". In Irish it is "ceathrú chun a trí".

The 24-hour clock is mainly used all across Ireland in schools, businesses, public transport, at airports and in the Irish Defence Forces.

== See also ==
- Time in Ireland
- Date and time notation in the United Kingdom
