= Date and time notation in Nepal =

- Full date: 19 July 2026 १९ जुलाई २०२६
- All-numeric date: 19/07/2026; 2026-07-19
- Time: 3:18 am [refresh]

Nepal uses both the DMY and YMD format when writing dates, and uses 12-hour format for time.

== Date ==
YYYY-MM-DD is official date format for the Bikram Sambat calendar used in Nepal. While speaking and writing full BS dates, the mmmm d, yyyy format is often used alongside the yyyy mmmm d format. For instance, the 23rd of Chaitra, 2077 BS can be spoken and written as Chaitra 23, 2077 (चैत २३, २०७७) or 2077 Chaitra 23 (२०७७ चैत २३). An example of Vikram Samvat YYYY-MM-DD usage used is the online news portal Onlinekhabar. When using the Gregorian calendar, both YYYY-MM-DD (2026-07-19) and DD/MM/YYYY (19/07/2026) format can be used. While the DMY format (19 July 2026) is used when writing full Gregorian dates, the MDY format (July 19, 2026) is also acceptable. All government documents need to be filled up in the YYYY-MM-DD format. A week starts on a Sunday (आइतबार) and ends on a Saturday (शनिबार).

=== Nepali months and days ===
==== Months ====
The names of months in the Vikram Samvat in Nepali with their roughly corresponding Gregorian months are given below.

Month	Gregorian
बैशाख	April – May
जेठ	May – June
असार	June – July
श्रावण	July – August
भदौ	August – September
आश्विन	September – October
कार्तिक	October – November
मंसिर	November – December
पुष	December – January
माघ	January – February
फाल्गुन	February – March
चैत्र	March – April

==== Days ====
The names of days in Nepali alongside their corresponding English days are given below:

Nepali	English
आइतबार	Sunday
सोमबार	Monday
मंगलबार	Tuesday
बुधबार	Wednesday
बिहिबार	Thursday
शुक्रबार	Friday
शनिबार	Saturday

== Time ==
The 12-hour notation (3:18 am) is widely used in daily life, written communication, and is used in spoken language. The 24-hour notation (03:18) is used only in rare situations where there would be widespread ambiguity. Examples include plane departure and landing timings. A colon is widely used to separate hours, minutes and seconds (e.g., 14:39:16).
