= Date and time notation in Greece =

In Greece the all-numeric form for dates is in the little endianness order of "day month year". Years can be written with 2 or 4 digits. For example, either 30/5/2023 or 30/5/23.

The 12-hour notation is used in verbal communication, but the 24-hour format is also used along with the 12-hour notation in writing. The minutes are usually written with two digits; the hour numbers are written with or without a leading zero.

== See also ==
- Time in Greece
