= MicroRNA 5008 =

Protein found in humans

MIR5008

Identifiers
- Aliases: MIR5008, microRNA 5008
- External IDs: GeneCards: MIR5008

Gene location (Human)
Chr.	Chromosome 1 (human)
Band	1q42.13	Start	227,941,590 bp
Band	1q42.13	End	227,941,683 bp
RNA expression pattern
Bgee	Human / Mouse (ortholog); Top expressed in: fundus; olfactory zone of nasal mucosa; blood; muscle of leg; gastrocnemius muscle; placenta; islet of Langerhans; left adrenal cortex; lymph node; endometrium / n/a; More reference expression data
BioGPS	n/a
Orthologs
Databases	NCBI: entry; OMA: entry
Species	Human	Mouse
Entrez	100847072	n/a
Ensembl	ENSG00000264483	n/a
UniProt	n a	n/a
RefSeq (mRNA)	n/a	n/a
RefSeq (protein)	n/a	n/a
Location (UCSC)	Chr 1: 227.94 – 227.94 Mb	n/a
PubMed search		n/a
- Wikidata
View/Edit Human

MicroRNA 5008 is a protein that in humans is encoded by the MIR5008 gene.

== Function ==
MicroRNAs (miRNAs) are short (20–24 nt) non-coding RNAs that are involved in post-transcriptional regulation of gene expression in multicellular organisms by affecting both the stability and translation of mRNAs. MiRNAs are transcribed by RNA polymerase II as part of capped and polyadenylated primary transcripts (pri-miRNAs) that can be either protein-coding or non-coding. The primary transcript is cleaved by the Drosha ribonuclease III enzyme to produce an approximately 70-nt stem-loop precursor miRNA (pre-miRNA), which is further cleaved by the cytoplasmic Dicer ribonuclease to generate the mature miRNA and antisense miRNA star (miRNA*) products. The mature miRNA is incorporated into a RNA-induced silencing complex (RISC), which recognizes target mRNAs through imperfect base pairing with the miRNA and most commonly results in translational inhibition or destabilization of the target mRNA. The RefSeq represents the predicted microRNA stem-loop.
