= Date and time notation in the United States =

Date and time notation in the United States []
- Full date: November 15, 2026; 15 November 2026
- All-numeric date: 11/15/2026; 2026-11-15; 15 11 26; 15 11 2026
- Time: 8:19 pm 20:19

Date and time notation in the United States differs from that used in nearly all other countries. It is inherited from one historical branch of conventions from the United Kingdom. American styles of notation have also influenced customs of date notation in Canada, creating confusion in international commerce. This format is also used in the Philippines, which was once an American Commonwealth.

In traditional American usage, dates are written in the month–day–year order (e.g. November 15, 2026) with a comma before and after the year if it is not at the end of a sentence, and time is written in 12-hour notation (e.g. 8:19 pm).

International date and time formats typically follow the ISO 8601 format (2026-11-15) for all-numeric dates, write the time using the 24-hour clock (20:19), and notate the date using a day–month–year format (15 November 2026). These forms are increasingly common in American professional, academic, technological, military, and other internationally oriented environments.

== Date ==
In the United States, dates are traditionally written in the "month-day-year" order, with neither increasing nor decreasing order of significance. This is called middle endian. This order is used in both the traditional all-numeric date (e.g., "1/21/24" or "01/21/2024") and the expanded form (e.g., "January 21, 2024"—usually spoken with the year as a cardinal number and the day as an ordinal number, e.g., "January twenty-first, twenty twenty-four"). The most commonly used separator in the all-numeric form is the slash (/), although the hyphen (-) and period (.) have also emerged in the all-numeric format recently due to globalization. The Chicago Manual of Style discourages writers from writing all-numeric dates, other than the year-month-day format advocated by ISO 8601, as it is not comprehensible to readers outside the United States.

The day-month-year order has been increasing in usage since the early 1980s. The month is usually written as an abbreviated name, as in "19 Jul 1942" (sometimes with hyphens). Many genealogical databases and the Modern Language Association citation style use this format. Visas and passports issued by the U.S. State Department also use the day-month-year order for human-readable dates and year-month-day for all-numeric encoding, in compliance with the International Civil Aviation Organization's standards for machine-readable travel documents.

The fully written "day-month-year" (e.g., 25 August 2006) in written American English is recommended by the Chicago Manual of Style for material that requires many full dates, as it does not require commas.

The year-month-day order, such as the ISO 8601 "YYYY-MM-DD" notation, is popular in computer applications because it reduces the amount of code needed to resolve and compute dates. It is also commonly used in software cases where there are many separately dated items, such as documents or media, because sorting alphanumerically will automatically result in the content being listed chronologically.

Two U.S. standards mandate the use of year-month-day formats: ANSI INCITS 30-1997 (R2008); and NIST FIPS PUB 4-2 (FIPS PUB 4-2 withdrawn in United States 2008-09-02), the earliest of which is traceable back to 1968. This is only required when compliance with the given standard is, or was, required.

The United States military uses four formats for standard military correspondence:

- Abbreviated format: 1- or 2-digit day, 3-letter abbreviation for the month, and 2-digit abbreviated year (e.g. 4 Feb 23)
- Standard format: 1- or 2-digit day, the spelled-out month, and 4-digit year (e.g. 4 February 2023)
- Civilian format: spelled out month, 1-or 2-digit day, a comma, and the 4-digit year (e.g. February 4, 2023).
- Date Time Group format, used most often in operation orders. This format uses DDHHMMZMONYY, with DD being the two-digit day, HHMM being the time on a 24-hour clock, Z being the timezone code, MON being the three-letter month, and YY being the two-digit year. For example, 041200ZFEB23 is noon, UTC, on 4 Feb 2023.

The military date notation is similar to the date notation in British English but is read cardinally (e.g. "Nineteen July") rather than ordinally (e.g. "The nineteenth of July").

Weeks are generally referred to by the date of some day within that week (e.g., "the week of May 25"), rather than by a week number. Many holidays and observances are identified relative to the day of the week on which they are fixed, either from the beginning of the month (first, second, etc.) or end (last, and far more rarely penultimate and antepenultimate). For example, Thanksgiving is defined as being on "the fourth Thursday in November". Some such definitions are more complex. For example, Election Day is defined as "the Tuesday next after the first Monday in the month of November" or "the first Tuesday after November 1". Calendars mostly show Sunday as the first day of the week.

=== Formal dates ===
In a small number of formal contexts, the date may be spelled out. The most formal format is "the [ordinal day of the month] day of [month] in the Year of our Lord [cardinal number year]". For example, the United States Constitution is dated "the seventeenth day of September in the year of our Lord one thousand seven hundred and eighty seven". Similar formats may be used for college diplomas.

== Time ==
The United States uses the 12-hour clock almost exclusively, not only in spoken language, but also in writing, even on timetables, for airline tickets, and computer software. The suffixes "a.m." and "p.m." (often represented as AM and PM) are appended universally in written language. Alternatively, people might specify "noon" or "midnight", after or instead of 12:00. (Business events, which are increasingly scheduled using groupware calendar applications, are less vulnerable to such ambiguity, since the software itself can be modified to take care of the naming conventions.) Where the a.m.–p.m. convention is inconvenient typographically (e.g., in dense tables), different fonts or colors are sometimes used instead. The most common usage in transport timetables for air, rail, bus, etc. is to use lightface for a.m. times and boldface for p.m. times. It is also not uncommon for AM and PM to be shortened to A and P.

=== 24-hour usage ===
The 24-hour clock is used in military, public safety, and scientific contexts in the United States. It is best known for its use by the military and is therefore commonly called "military time". In U.S. military use, 24-hour time is traditionally written without a colon (1800 instead of 18:00). For exact hour times, they are referred to as "hundred", so 10:00 would be referred to as "ten hundred hours" and 11:00 as "eleven hundred hours", from the mathematical interpretation of the numeral sequence. Hours between 1 and 10 have their leading zero spoken as "oh", as in "oh eight thirty" to mean 8:30 a.m., although 00:30 would be "zero thirty". The Army adds the word "hours" after the military time (e.g. "eighteen hundred hours"), including for times not on the hour mark (e.g. "sixteen thirty hours"); however, the Navy and Marine Corps do not do this. Midnight is known interchangeably as either "zero hundred" or "twenty four hundred", often chosen based on whether it is the start or end of a time range, respectively, though there are no times "higher" than 2400.

The 24-hour notation is also widely used by astronomers, hospitals, public safety personnel (police, fire department, EMS), various forms of transportation, and at radio and other broadcast media outlets behind the scenes where scheduling programming needs to be exact, without mistaking AM and PM. In these cases, exact and unambiguous communication of time is critical. If someone mistakes 5:00 AM for 5:00 PM in a hospital for example, when medication or other medical treatment is needed at a certain time, the outcome could be dire. Thus 24-hour time (5:00 PM written as 17:00) is used.

=== Characteristics ===
Some style guides and most persons suggest not to use a leading zero with a single-digit hour; for example, "3:52 p.m." is preferred over "03:52 p.m.". (The leading zero is more commonly used with the 24-hour notation; especially in computer applications because it can help to maintain column alignment in tables and correct sorting order, and also because it helps to highlight the 24-hour character of the given time.)

Times of day ending in :00 minutes may be pronounced as the numbered hour followed by o'clock (e.g., 10:00 as ten o'clock, 2:00 as two o'clock, 4:00 as four o'clock, etc.). This may be followed by the a.m. or p.m. designator, or might not be, if obvious. O'clock itself may be omitted, leaving a time such as four a.m. or four p.m. Instead of "a.m." and "p.m.", times can also be described as "in the morning", "in the afternoon", "in the evening", or "at night".

The minutes (other than :00) may be pronounced in a variety of ways:

Minutes :01 through :09 are usually pronounced as oh one through oh nine. :10 through :59 are their usual number-words. For example, "9:45 a.m." is usually pronounced "nine forty-five" or sometimes "nine forty-five a.m.".

Times of day from :01 to :29 minutes past the hour are commonly pronounced with the words "after" or "past", for example, 10:17 being "seventeen after ten" or "seventeen past ten". :15 minutes is very commonly called "quarter after" or "quarter past" and :30 minutes universally "half past" the current hour, e.g., 4:30, "half past four". Times of day from :31 to :59 are, by contrast, given subtractively with the words "to", "of", "until", or "till": 12:55 would be pronounced as "five to one".

:45 minutes is pronounced as "quarter to", "quarter until", or "quarter till". For example, "9:45 a.m." is often pronounced "fifteen till ten" or "quarter to ten", or sometimes "quarter to ten in the morning".

However, it is always acceptable to pronounce the time using number words and the aforementioned "oh" convention, for example, 12:55 as "twelve fifty-five", 12:09 as "twelve oh-nine", 12:30 as "twelve thirty", and 12:15 as "twelve fifteen".

== See also ==
- Date format by country
