= Date and time notation in Poland =

In Poland, the official system for representing dates and times follows the international ISO 8601 standard. However, in less official use, other conventions prevail, such as the day-month-year order and several Polish language abbreviations.

== Date ==
In Poland, the first system for denoting abbreviated dates used Roman numerals for months (e.g., 11 XI 1918 for Independence Day). The current year can be replaced by the abbreviation br. (bieżący rok; current year) and the current month can similarly be replaced by the abbreviation bm. (bieżący miesiąc; current month), in which case the year is omitted altogether. The Roman notation still prevails in private communication, except for date stamps where Arabic numerals are used (as in "Berlin, 9.05.1945"). The authorities changed the order of the date stamps in 1979 to follow Polish industrial standard PN-90/N-01204 (Polskie Normy) similar to ISO 8601; 1981-12-13 has been the preferred format since then.

The month name is written where enough space is provided for the date; the month is in the genitive case (because of the meaning e.g., “first day of May”) and the ordinals are often incorrectly followed by a full stop to indicate they are ordinal; the date is often preceded by the abbreviation "dn." (dnia; day) and followed by the abbreviation "r." (rok year), as in "dn. 1. maja 1997 r.". The month name can be abbreviated to three initial letters where an actual date stamping device is used, e.g., on letter envelopes.

Poland adopted the ISO 8601 standard for date format in official, especially electronic, communication in 2002. For everyday usage and for less official papers, however, the traditional formats are d.mm.[yy]yy or dd.mm.[yy]yy (i.e., 7.08.2008, 07.08.2008, 07.08.08) are very common in Poland because of speaking order: "day month year".

Monday is the first day of the week.

== Time ==
A 12-hour clock is commonly used in speech when unambiguous (usually amongst people who live in or come from the Anglosphere), with the AM/PM distinction denoted by phrases rano ("in the morning"), po południu ("in the afternoon"), wieczorem ("in the evening"), w nocy ("at night"), and nad ranem ("before daybreak" or "in the wee hours") when needed; written communication uses 24-hour clock almost universally, including written forms of informal speech. 24-hour times will often be read out in 12-hour form, so that the recipient of a text message "Let's meet at 15:00" could relay it as "she said to meet at three" to their companions. The written notation "AM" and "PM" is never used, not even to transcribe speech that used 12-hour times. Times that introduce ambiguity in 12-hour notation (12:00AM and 12:00PM) are sometimes avoided in speech and replaced by "noon" and "midnight", but in the absence of further clarification, 24-hour interpretation prevails, such that dwunasta ("twelve o'clock") refers to noon and midnight is expressed as dwunasta w nocy ("twelve o'clock at night") or similar.

In a speech hours are usually divided in quarters, and when read out often rounded to the nearest 15-minutes, so that 12:43 becomes za piętnaście pierwsza ("fifteen to one") or za kwadrans pierwsza ("quarter to one"), and similarly 18:14 becomes piętnaście po szóstej ("fifteen past six") or kwadrans po szóstej ("quarter past six"). Half hours are given as wpół do, i.e. half to, rather than half past as is common in English, and similar to many non-English languages. Half hours can themselves be used as anchors for "to" and "past", so that 17:35 may be read as pięć po wpół do szóstej ("five past half to six"). Quarters of an hour are also used to denote time intervals, such as in czekaliśmy prawie trzy kwadranse ("we waited for almost three quarters [of an hour]"). Quarters, halves and "to"/"past" notation are used exclusively in speech and exclusively with 12-hour times, such that 13:16 might be read as szesnaście po pierwszej ("sixteen past one") or kwadrans po pierwszej ("quarter past one"), but it's an error to say szesnaście po trzynastej ("sixteen past thirteen"); it may only be pronounced trzynasta szesnaście ("thirteen-sixteen").

The 24-hour clock is used exclusively in official documents. The day breaks around 4 AM according to common sense, so that timetables will often roll earlier hours into the preceding day, albeit several broadcasters extend their published schedules till 6 AM.

When the hour goes by itself, it is preceded by the abbreviation "godz." (godzina; hour); when it is accompanied by minutes, this introductory abbreviation is not needed. Minutes are traditionally superscribed to the hour and underlined, as in 17^{45} (both in handwriting and in typewritten documents). This is by far the prevailing form in handwritten text, but very rare in electronic communication other than official documents, owing to the difficulty of producing it in most applications. According to the Polish printed publishing norm, a dot is used to separate hours and minutes when not using superscription but popularity of electronic devices caused the dot to be often replaced with a colon (less official).
