= Date and time notation in Croatia =

Croatia uses the day-month-year date notation and both the 24-hour and the 12-hour clock for expressing time of day.

== Date ==
In Croatian, dates are written using the day-month-year format. The month can be spelled out in lower case (e.g. 17. ožujka 2018. for 17 March 2018) or represented by an Arabic or Roman ordinal number (17. 3. 2018., 17. III. 2018.). Ordinal numbers are always followed by a full stop and separated by spaces. The genitive case is used for the month name (implies e.g. 17. [dan] ožujka "the 17th [day] of March"), but the nominative case (e.g. 17. ožujak 2018.) is also often seen in (incorrect) colloquial use.

17. ožujka should be spoken sedamnaesti ožujka ("the 17th of March", using nominative for the day) or sedamnaestog ožujka ("on the 17th of March", using genitive). Leading zeroes in dates should be omitted in non-technical situations, and the names of months and days of week are only capitalised at the beginning of a sentence. The week starts on Monday, while the weekend consists of Saturday and Sunday.

Names of months
English	Croatian
January	siječanj
February	veljača
March	ožujak
April	travanj
May	svibanj
June	lipanj

English	Croatian
July	srpanj
August	kolovoz
September	rujan
October	listopad
November	studeni
December	prosinac

Days of week
English	Croatian
Monday	ponedjeljak
Tuesday	utorak
Wednesday	srijeda
Thursday	četvrtak
Friday	petak
Saturday	subota
Sunday	nedjelja

== Time ==
In formal and written language, the time of day is usually expressed using the 24-hour clock. Hours and minutes are separated using either a colon or a full stop. Leading zeroes should only be used for minutes, except in tables, on electronic displays etc. In informal use, especially in speech, the 12-hour clock is used. However, instead of the English "a.m."/"p.m." system, descriptive phrases are used in cases of ambiguity, e.g. ujutro "in the morning", prijepodne "before noon", poslijepodne "afternoon", navečer "in the evening".
