= Date and time notation in the Czech Republic =

The Czech Republic hosts two different standardized forms of date and time writing.

The Rules of Czech Orthography are mandatory for the educational system. These rules are based on tradition and are widely used by common people. The date is written in "day month year" order, each part separated by a space. Day and month are written as ordinal numbers and year as a cardinal number (1. 12. 2009). The month can be replaced by its full name in genitive case (1. prosince 2009). Writing the month in Roman digits (1. XII. 2009) is considered archaic. The time of day format is dot separated hours and minutes without a space (3.15). However to express time period the colon must be used (3:15).

The second format is defined by the Czech State Norm (ČSN 01 6910) based on ISO standards. It accepts the ISO format (2009-12-01 and 03:15) and allows simplified traditional formatting and/or globalised formatting such as leading zeroes or omitted spaces (01.12.2009). The second norm is intended for technical devices and tabular output. However, due to globalisation and import of foreign goods, the time format with colon instead of full stop (3:15 or 03:15) is accepted and used by ordinary people more than the traditional system.

The 24-hour cycle is used for official and exact purposes; the 12-hour cycle is also used in daily life, especially in spoken language.

The week starts on Monday.

Since 2000, the year value is almost always written in four-digit form. In spoken language, especially by older people, years referencing to the second half of 20th century are abbreviated by stripping the century digits (89 instead of 1989). Such abbreviations are usually marked by leading apostrophes ('89) or horizontal bars above both digits.
