= Date and time notation in Belgium =

According to the BIN standard (NBN Z 01-002), there are three ways to write a date in Belgium:

- day d month yyyy ("maandag 9 september 2000"/"lundi 9 septembre 2000"/"Montag, den 9. September 2000")
- dd.mm.yyyy ("09.09.2000")
- yyyy-mm-dd ("2000-09-09") is the ISO 8601.

All Belgian weeks begin on Monday at 00:00.

In written language, time is expressed exclusively in 24-hour using a colon to separate hours and minutes (HH:MM). It is written 09:09/21:21.
