= Date and time notation in Norway =

== Date ==
Norway uses three date systems:

- DD.MM.YYYY (e.g., 24.12.2006 for Christmas Eve, or 01.05.2006 for Labour Day) is by far the most common system, and is the one recommended by the Language Council of Norway. The use of strokes and hyphens are also common, especially in handwriting (e.g. 24/12-2005).
- MMMM D. YYYY is used in Lule Sami and Southern Sami languages
- YYYY-MM-DD (the ISO 8601-standard) is used to some extent in official documents and in computer related materials.

Week numbering is also very common both written and orally, albeit less so in private life.

The week always begins on Mondays and ends on Sundays.

== Time ==
Written time is almost always in the 24-hour clock. In spoken language, a mixture of the two systems are used:

- When giving exact times, or when speaking in official settings (radio, TV, etc.), the 24-hour clock is always used. News programs often use the 24-hour clock in their very names, including Atten tretti/Dagsnytt Atten, Redaksjon 21 and Sytten Tretti. Entertainment shows like Halvsju have on the other hand been named after the 12-hour clock.
- When speaking informally, the 12-hour clock is often used. Minutes are usually rounded off to the nearest five minutes, and are given according to the closest half hour period: «Klokka er ti på halv fire» («the clock is ten to half four», i.e., 15:20 or 3:20 p.m.) and «klokka er fem over halv sju» («the clock is five past half seven», i.e., 18:35 or 6:35 p.m.).

There are two ways of pronouncing numbers:

- The "modern", standard counting: «Klokka er tjueto» («The clock is twentytwo»). The modern variant is used in all official radio programmes and when speaking officially.
- The traditional counting: «Klokka er toogtyve» («The clock is twoandtwenty»). The traditional variant is used by some in more informal settings.

Many numbers also have different pronunciations depending on dialect (for instance «sju» and «syv» both mean seven, and «tjue» and «tyve» both mean twenty).
