= Date and time notation in Turkey =

Date and time notation in the Turkey []
- Full date: 15 Temmuz 2026
- All-numeric date: 15.07.2026
- Time: 19:26

In Turkey, the little endian date format is used, and 24-hour clock is more common than the 12-hour clock system. The system is also used in the unrecognized Northern Cyprus.

== Date ==
=== Present ===
In Turkey, dates are written in the form DD.MM.YYYY (15.07.2026), or "D <name of the month> YYYY" (little endian format, 15 Temmuz 2026). It is rare to use abbreviations for names of months.

Monday is the first day of the week.

=== Historical ===
Turkey historically used the lunar Islamic calendar up to 1677 (for fiscal purposes) and 1926 (for general purposes), and also up to present (for Turkish Muslims); the solar Julian calendar between 1677 and 1917 (for fiscal purposes), the solar based Rumi calendar between 1839 and 1926 (for civic purposes), and the modern Gregorian calendar since 1917 (for fiscal purposes) and 1926 (for general purposes). Until the end of 1920s, the Ottoman Turkish uses the Eastern Arabic numeral system to denote dates on calendars. Thus, for example, ١٣٤١ denoted 1341 AH (1 January through 31 December 1925) and ١٩٢٦ denoted 1926 CE.

== Time ==
Turkey uses the 24-hour clock system. In informal speech, however, the 12-hour clock is more commonly used. When speaking in the 12-hour system, the words such as "sabah" (morning), "akşam" (evening) or "gece" (night) are generally used before telling the time to clarify whether it is a.m. or p.m. (i.e., sabah 9 means 9 a.m. and akşam 5 means 5 p.m.). An exception is that the hours 12.30 AM/PM are usually both referred to as "yarım" (meaning half).
