= Date and time notation in Denmark =

Date notation in Denmark
- First day in the century: Present

According to Dansk Sprognævn (DSN)
lørdag, den 1. januar 2000	torsdag, den 12. november 2026
lørdag 1. januar 2000	torsdag 12. november 2026
1. januar 2000	12. november 2026
1. jan.. 2000	12. nov.. 2026
1. jan.. 00	12. nov.. 26
1.1.2000	12.11.2026
1.1.00	12.11.26
1/1 2000	12/11 2026
1/1 00	12/11 26
1/1-00	12/11-26

Commonly used non-standard
01.01.2000	12.11.2026
01.01.00	12.11.26
01-01-2000	12-11-2026
01-01-00	12-11-26

According to Dansk Standard (DS) and to DSN
2000-01-01	2026-11-12
20000101	20261112

== Date ==
In Denmark, the official standard is YYYY-MM-DD ISO 8601 but it is not widely used compared to the traditionally used standard DD.MM.(YY)YY (e.g., 24.12.2006 for Christmas Eve and 1.5.2006 or 01.05.2006 for Labour Day), which is by far the most common system. Dots and hyphens are the most common separators, although using both a stroke and hyphen is sometimes used, especially in handwriting (e.g. 24/12-2005). According to the official rules in Retskrivningsordbogen, there shall not be zeros before 1 and 5 in the date 1.5.2006, but it is quite common with them: 01.05.2006.

Days and months are written in lower case, often beginning with the definite article "den" (or abbreviated "d."), e.g. "mandag(,) d. 4. januar" ("Monday the 4th of January").

Week numbering is also very common both written and orally, albeit less so in private life.

The week always begins on Mondays and ends on Sundays.

ISO 8601 has been adopted as Danish national standard DS/ISO 8601, but it is not widely used.

== Time ==
Written time is almost always in the 24-hour clock. In spoken language, a mixture of the two systems are used:

- When giving exact times, or when speaking in official settings (radio, TV, etc.), the 24-hour clock is always used.
- When speaking informally, the 12-hour clock is often used. Minutes are usually rounded off to the nearest five minutes. In these styles, the word for "minutes" is usually but not always left out. For example (transliterated into English):
  - Six (6 am or pm)
  - 20 (minutes) past seven
  - 10 (minutes) to eight
  - A quarter past nine
  - A quarter to eleven
  - Half two (1:30)
- Five to half three (2:25)
- Five past half four (3:35)
