= Date and time notation in Serbia =

== Date ==
Serbian language uses either all-numeric form of dates in the little-endian date-month-year order, or the same order in which numerical month is replaced with its literal name. The dot is used as a separator, followed by space and matches the convention of pronouncing day, month and year as ordinal numbers (31. 12. 2006.). Note that dot is placed after the year as well. The space is, however, optional, as dates could be written and without the space (for example 31.12.2006.).

Years can be written either with four or two digits, and in the latter case, century is usually replaced with an apostrophe (31. 12. ’06.). Leading zero is rarely used, and in those cases which are considered bad practice, only with months (however it is also optional for the days) (6. 05. 2006.). When literal names of the months are used they are not capitalized, and the four-digit format for the year is always used (31. decembar 2006.). Yet another alternative is to use Roman numerals to indicate the month. In this case a dot is omitted (31. XII 2006.).

Day of the week always precedes the date (nedelja, 31. 12. 2006), is separated by comma, but can be abbreviated to the first three letters, which are then capitalized (NED, 31. 12. '06.) – note that in that case, the shortest date format is used. Starting day of the week is Monday, and the weekend falls on Saturday and Sunday.

Weeks are rarely referred to by their order in the year, although they are always printed in large format calendars, typically the number of a week in the month is used (third week in March, instead of week 12).

One of the most common errors while typing the date with the full month name is the capitalization of the month after the dot after the day of the month, usually caused by typing the date with a word processor such as Microsoft Word.

== Time ==
The 24-hour clock is almost exclusively used in writing, while spoken language is dominated by the 12-hour clock, usually without noting whether the hour is AM or PM – that information is derived from the context. However, when time of the day needs to be emphasized, many descriptive alternatives exist, since AM/PM are not known to Serbian language:

- 00.00 and 24.00 — ponoć (midnight)
- 00.00—12.00 — pre podne (before noon)
- 03.00—10.00 — ujutru (morning) (i.e. 8 ujutru means 8 AM) or jutros (this [past] morning)
- 12.00 — podne (noon)
- 12.00—24.00 — posle podne or short po podne (afternoon)
- 19.00—23.00 — uveče (evening) or večeras (this/upcoming evening)
- 23.00—03.00 — noću (at night), sinoć (last night) or noćas (ambiguous in colloquial speech, either tonight or last night)

Note that certain periods overlap, and are given roughly, since this colloquial use of the language is not regulated and is mostly customary. Literal names for midnight (ponoć) and noon (podne) are often used instead of numerical "12 o'clock".

In written Serbian, time is expressed by the 24-hour notation, using dot as a separator. Incorrect use of colon has its fair share, mostly influenced by international time notation. However, some official documents use the comma for the separator.

In spoken language, when one is telling the time between full and half hour (i.e. 14.00-14.29), a reference is made to the past full hour. Once the half hour has passed (14.30-14.59), two variants can be used – one referring to the previous, and another to the following full hour. Latter variant is more frequently used.

Hour	Common reading	Alternative	Rare alternative using quarters
14.00	dva [sata] (two [hours (o'clock)])	dva [sata] posle podne (two [hours (o'clock)] afternoon)	
14.05	dva i pet (two and five)		
14.10	dva i deset (two and ten)		
14.15	dva i petnaest (two and fifteen)		dva i četvrt (two and quarter)
14.20	dva i dvadeset (two and twenty)	deset do pola tri (ten to half three)	
14.25	dva i dvadeset pet (two and twenty five)	pet do pola tri (five to half three)	
14.30	pola tri (half three)	dva i trideset (two and thirty)	
14.35	dvadeset pet do tri (twenty five to three)	dva i trideset pet (two and thirty five)	
14.40	dvadeset do tri (twenty to three)	dva i četrdeset (two and forty)	
14.45	petnaest do tri (fifteen to three)	dva i četrdeset pet (two and forty five)	četvrt do tri (quarter to three)
14.50	deset do tri (ten to three)	dva i pedeset (two and fifty)	
14.55	pet do tri (five to three)	dva i pedeset pet (two and fifty five)	
15.00	tri [sata] (three [hours(o'clock)] )	tri [sata] posle podne (three [hours (o'clock)] afternoon)	

In very formal speech, designations "hours" and "minutes" are added, while reference is made only to the previous hour, i.e. 14.45 would be dva sata i četrdeset pet minuta (two hours and forty five minutes), or sometimes even in 24-hour format, četrnaest časova i četrdeset pet minuta (fourteen hours and forty five minutes). Note that among the two words for "hour", sat is common used for 1 to 12 range and čas for 0 and 13 to 24, but there are no official rules.

Also, when speaking about the present hour in the second half of the hour, the following hour is sometimes omitted from the phrase in colloquial speech, i.e. in reference to 14.45 instead of saying petnaest do tri (fifteen to three), one could say just petnaest do (fifteen to).

Leading zeroes for hours are optional, but are very common in automated output and sometimes in written time. However, Windows' region and language configuration for both Serbian variations (Cyrillic and Latin) omits the leading zero for hours and days and months in the date.
