= Date and time notation in Vietnam =

Date and time notation in Vietnam []
- Full date: 23 tháng 8 năm 2026
- All-numeric date: 23/08/2026; 23-08-2026; 23.08.2026 (sometimes)
- Time: 19:56

Date and time notation in Vietnam describes methods of expressing date and time used in Vietnam.

== Date ==
In Vietnam, dates follow the "day month year" order. All-numeric dates can be written as:

- d/m/yyyy (9/1/2021)
- d-m-yyyy (9-1-2021)
- dd/mm/yyyy (09/01/2021)
- dd-mm-yyyy (09-01-2021)

A dot in the line (period or full stop) can also be used (i.e. 9.1.2021, 09.01.2021).

In the full form, the month name is alphanumeric. Example: "9 tháng 1 năm 2021". Leading zeros may also be used: "09 tháng 01 năm 2021".

Monday is the first day of the week and Sunday is the last day of the week.

The names of months and days are as follows:

English	Vietnamese numeric forms	Vietnamese textforms
January	Tháng 1	Tháng Một
February	Tháng 2	Tháng Hai
March	Tháng 3	Tháng Ba
April	Tháng 4	Tháng Tư
May	Tháng 5	Tháng Năm
June	Tháng 6	Tháng Sáu
July	Tháng 7	Tháng Bảy
August	Tháng 8	Tháng Tám
September	Tháng 9	Tháng Chín
October	Tháng 10	Tháng Mười
November	Tháng 11	Tháng Mười một
December	Tháng 12	Tháng Mười hai

English	Vietnamese	Vietnamese numeric forms	Vietnamese abbreviation
Monday	Thứ Hai	Thứ 2	T2
Tuesday	Thứ Ba	Thứ 3	T3
Wednesday	Thứ Tư	Thứ 4	T4
Thursday	Thứ Năm	Thứ 5	T5
Friday	Thứ Sáu	Thứ 6	T6
Saturday	Thứ Bảy	Thứ 7	T7
Sunday	Chủ nhật (Chúa nhật)		CN

== Time ==
Vietnam uses the 24-hour notations in writing; an "h" or ":" is used as separator, e.g. "13h15" or "13:15". Full hours can be written just with an "h", e.g. "6h" (not "6h00" or "06h00"). Transport timetables use it exclusively, as do legal documents and television schedules. It can also be used orally (e.g. the time 00:05 would be read as Không giờ năm phút ("zero hour, five minutes")).

The 12-hour notations is also used orally but instead of AM/PM, it's necessary to specify the place of the sun:

	Time span	Example	Notes
Đêm (Night)	22:00 to 00:59	12 giờ đêm	
Sáng (Morning)	01:00 to 10:59	7 giờ sáng	Also abbreviated as "SA" in computer systems (e.g. Windows) to denote "a.m."
Trưa (Noon)	11:00 to 12:59	12 giờ trưa	
Chiều (Afternoon)	13:00 to 17:59	3 giờ chiều	Also abbreviated as "CH" in computer systems (e.g. Windows) to denote "p.m."
Tối (Evening/night)	18:00 to 21:59	7 giờ tối	

== See also ==
- Date format by country
