= Date and time notation in Cyprus =

In Cyprus the all-numeric form for dates is in the little endianness order of "day month year". Years are written with either 2 or 4 digits. For example, either 24/5/2004 or 24/5/04. In the Turkish occupied part in Northern Cyprus (like in Turkey), the traditional all-numeric form of writing Gregorian dates is the little-endian day.month.year order, using a dot on the line (period or full stop) as the separator (e.g. 31.12.1991 or 31.12.91).

== Time ==
The 12-hour notation is used in verbal communication, but the 24-hour format is also used along with the 12-hour notation in writing. The minutes are usually written with two digits; the hour numbers are written without a leading zero.

In Northern Cyprus the 24-hour clock system is used officially and in writing. In informal speech, however, the 12-hour clock is more commonly used. When speaking in the 12-hour system, the words such as "sabah" (morning), "akşam" (evening) or "gece" (night) are generally used before telling the time to clarify whether it is a.m. or p.m. (i.e., sabah 9 means 9 a.m. and akşam 5 means 5 p.m.). An exception is that the hours 12.30 AM/PM are usually both referred to as "yarım" (meaning half).
