= Date and time notation in Hungary =

Date and time in Hungary
- Full date: 2026. január 24., szombat
- All-numeric date: 2026. 01. 24.
- Time: 12 óra 53 perc

Date and time notation in Hungary has several conventions.

In the country of Hungary, individual days are usually expressed in year-month-day format, with numeric date elements typically followed by a period. For example, 1 August 1999 could be expressed as 1999. augusztus 1., 1999. aug. 1., 1999. 08. 01., or 1999. VIII. 1. Also, the week starts on a Monday.

Times of day are usually expressed as "hh óra mm perc" (where "hh" and "mm" are to be replaced with the actual day thereof), but hh.mm or hh:mm are also acceptable formats. The 24-hour clock can be used in both formal and informal use, but the 12-hour clock is used more in informal use. The Hungarian language has many words for periods in the day, including hajnal (dawn or predawn), reggel (morning), délelőtt (before noon), dél (noon), délután (afternoon), este (evening), éjjel (night), and éjfél (midnight). These words can be said before the time.

== Date ==
=== Full dates ===
In Hungary, date is traditionally expressed in big-endian form, like ISO 8601. Numeric date elements are followed by a dot. The format yyyy. month d. is commonly used, the name of the month can be abbreviated (standard are ‘jan.’, ‘febr.’, ‘márc.’, ‘ápr.’, ‘máj.’, ‘jún.’, ‘júl.’, ‘aug.’, ‘szept.’, ‘okt.’, ‘nov.’, ‘dec.’). Months can also be written using Roman or Arabic numerals. Examples:

- 1999. augusztus 1.
- 1999. aug. 1.
- 1999. 08. 01.
- 1999. VIII. 1.

As year and day elements in Hungarian are ordinal numbers, they are followed by a dot. However, unless a suffix is added, they are said as cardinal numbers. Also note that stacking of symbols when writing in Hungarian is considered a bad practice, therefore when a suffix is attached to the date using a hyphen, the dot is omitted.

- 1999. augusztus 1-jén (on August 1, 1999)

=== Single years ===
A single year is followed by a dot unless it is

- followed with a suffix ‘1999-ben’ (in 1999)
- the object of the sentence ‘1999 szép év volt.’ (1999 was a nice year.)
- followed with a postposition ‘1999 után’ (after 1999)
- a genitive ‘1999 tele’ (winter of 1999)
- in parentheses ‘születésének éve (1999)…’ (the year of his/her birth (1999)…)

The dot can also be omitted in other cases such as memorials or book covers.

=== Weeks ===
Monday is the first day of the week.

== Time ==
=== Specific times of day ===
Like in most countries, the 24-hour clock is used in formal or informal and 12-hour clock in informal. The time format is "hh óra mm perc", but the numeric form hh.mm or hh:mm can also be used. Example:

- 10.35 or 10:35

=== Words for times of day ===
The following are commonly accepted divisions of the day that can be said before the time:

- hajnal (dawn) – 1–5 a.m.
- reggel (morning) – 6–9 a.m.
- délelőtt (before noon) – 10–11 a.m.
- délután (afternoon) – 1–5 p.m.
- este (evening) – 6–10 p.m.
- éjjel (night) – 11 p.m.-1 a.m.

Additionally, dél (noon) and éjfél (midnight) may be used.

=== Quarters of the hour ===
Each hour is divided into four equal periods and are verbally referred to as in the following examples:

- negyed 8 (quarter 8) – 7:15
- fél 8 (half 8) – 7:30
- háromnegyed 8 (three-quarter 8) – 7:45

Combining the above with 5 perc múlva (5 minutes before) or 5 perccel múlt (5 minutes after) is commonly used when asked for the time. Example:

- 5 perc múlva háromnegyed 8 – 7:40
- 3 perccel múlt 7 – 7:03
