= Date and time notation in France =

- Full date: 22 janvier 2026
- All-numeric date: 22/01/2026; 2026-01-22
- Time: 11:02; 11 h 02 [refresh]

France most commonly records the date using the day-month-year order with an oblique stroke or slash (”/”) as the separator with numerical values, for example, 31/12/1992. The 24-hour clock is used to express time, using the lowercase letter "h" as the separator in between hours and minutes, for example, 14 h 05.

== Date ==
In France, the all-numeric form for dates is in the order "day month year", using an oblique stroke or slash as the separator. Example: 31/12/1992. Years can be written with two or four digits, and numbers may be written with or without leading zero. Since three months have four-letter names, the nomenclature of months in the French language most often uses three- to four-lettered abbreviations as follows: jan., fév., mars, avr., mai, juin, juil., août, sept., oct., nov., déc. When months are strictly limited to three letters, juin (June) and juillet (July) are sometimes abbreviated as JUN and JUL respectively, in Canada.

The expanded form is "22 décembre 2010", optionally with the day of the week: "le mercredi 22 décembre 2010". The first day of the month is a special case: a suffix is added to the number, "le 1^{er} avril 2001", where 1^{er} is spoken "premier", meaning "first".

The first day of the week in France is Monday.

== Time ==
The 24-hour notation is used in writing with an h as a separator (h for heure, meaning "hour"). Example: 14 h 05 (1405 [14:05] hours or 2:05 pm). Though the correct form includes spaces on both sides of the h, it is common to see them omitted: 14h05. The minutes are usually written with two digits; the hour numbers can be written with or without leading zero.

Generally speaking, French speakers also use the 24-hour clock when they speak. Sometimes the 12-hour clock is used orally, but only in informal circumstances. Since there is no one-to-one equivalent of "am" and "pm" in French, context must be relied on to figure out which one is meant. To clarify, people may use some sentences like "9 heures du matin" (literally "9 o'clock in the morning") or "9 heures du soir" (literally "9 o'clock in the evening")... but most French speakers would still find using the 24-hour clock a more convenient way of expressing time clearly.

== See also ==
- French Republican Calendar
