= DIN 5008 =

DIN standard in the field of text processing

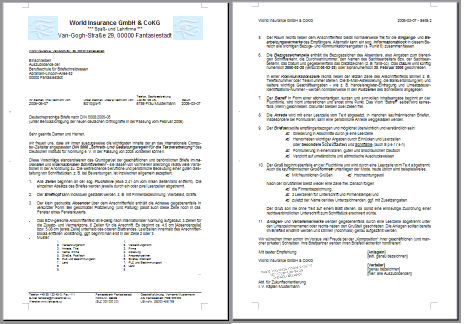
Sample of a German business letter, designed according to the rules of DIN 5008

The German national standard DIN 5008 by Deutsches Institut für Normung (DIN) specifies writing and layout rules for word processing. As such it is one of the fundamental standards for office communication and administrative work in Germany. Today, the standard is maintained by the Normenausschuss Informationstechnik und Anwendungen – Fachbereich Bürotechnik, Bankwesen und elektronisches Geschäftswesen (NA 043–03).

The rules and recommendations for word processing and typewriting define the typographically correct usage of punctuation and characters for words, mathematical signs, abbreviations, formulas as well as the proper representation of numbers (including dates and times), the usage of text for emphasis, the layout and organization of tables, outlines and templates in order to create well-arranged, easily accessible and purposeful text documents.

While DIN 5008 covered text processing with typewriters until 1996, newer revisions discuss issues related to word processing on PCs as well. The 2020 edition does not mention the typewriter at all.

== Revisions ==
- DIN 5008:1949-04
- DIN 5008:1951-06
- DIN 5008:1963-11
- DIN 5008:1975-11
- DIN 5008:1986-11
- DIN 5008:1996-05
- DIN 5008:2001-11
- DIN 5008:2005-05
- DIN 5008:2011-04
- DIN 5008:2020-03

== See also ==
- DIN ISO 8601:2006-09 (formerly DIN EN 28601:1993-02)
- Date and time notation in Europe

== Literature ==
- Deutsches Institut für Normung (2011-04-01). Schreib- und Gestaltungsregeln für die Textverarbeitung (in German). Beuth Verlag. ISBN 978-3-410-21367-3. Comment: Special print of DIN 5008:2011-04.
