= Date and time notation in the United Kingdom =

Date and time notation in the United Kingdom []
- Full date: 25 October 2026
- All-numeric date: 25/10/26; 25/10/2026; 2026-10-25
- Time: 03:18; 3:18 am

Date and time notation in the United Kingdom records the date using the day–month–year format (31 December 1999, 31/12/99 or 31/12/1999). The time can be written using either the 24-hour clock (23:59) or the 12-hour clock (11:59 p.m.), either with a colon or a full stop (11.59 p.m.).

== Date ==
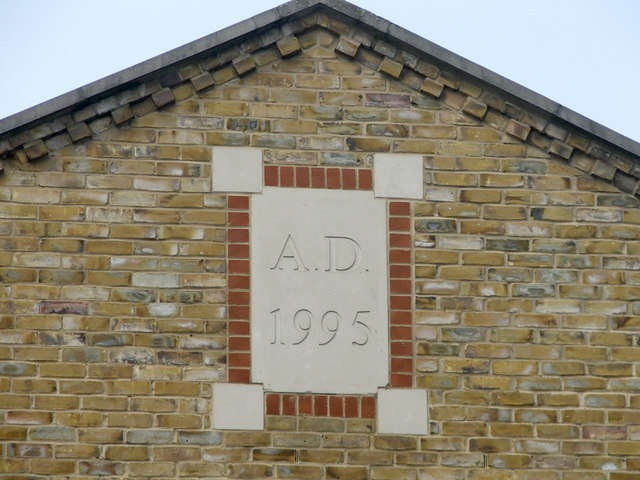
Datestone on houses in Harmood Street, London

=== Date notation in English ===
Dates are traditionally and most commonly written in day–month–year (DMY) order:

- 31 December 1999
- 31/12/99

Formal style manuals discourage writing the day of the month as an ordinal number (for example "31st December"), except with an incomplete reference, such as "They set off on 12 August 1960 and arrived on the 18th".

When saying the date, it is usually pronounced using "the", then the ordinal number of the day first, then the preposition "of", then the month (for example "the thirty-first of December"). The month-first form (for example "December the third") was widespread until the mid-20th century and remains the most common format for newspapers across the United Kingdom. Example: The Times and the British tabloids (Daily Mail, Daily Mirror, The Sun, Daily Express) all have 'Friday, December 31, 2021', while The Guardian, the Financial Times and The Daily Telegraph all have 'Friday 31 December 2021'. Consequently in the UK there is no standard pattern for long form dates when printed, as opposed to when using numeric dates, for which there are standard formats.

The month-first format is still spoken, perhaps more commonly when not including a year in the sentence. When the date is written out in full, or when spoken, usage can be one or the other. The day-first is usually well preferred over the other, but there is no risk of ambiguity.

=== All-numeric dates ===
All-numeric dates are used in notes and references, but not running prose. They can be written in several forms. For example, to represent 31 December 1999:

- 31/12/99 or 31.12.99
- 31.xii.99 (unusual)
- 1999-12-31 (ISO 8601 format increasingly adopted especially when required for sorting purposes)

The year may also be written in full (31/12/1999). It contrasts with date and time notation in the United States, where the month is placed first, leading to confusion in international communications: in the United States, 2/11/03 is interpreted as 11 February 2003. To remedy this, the month is sometimes written in Roman numerals, a format common in some European countries: 2.xi.03.

The ISO 8601 format (adopted as British Standard BS ISO 8601:2004) is unambiguous and machine-readable. It is used in technical, scientific, financial, and computing contexts. Lists of dates in this format, when sorted lexicographically, correspond to their chronological order. The Government Digital Service requires it for all forms of data transmission. Dates in this format are separated with hyphens: 2003-11-02.

=== Weeks ===
Weeks are generally referred to by the date on which they start, with Monday often treated as the first day of the week, for example "the week commencing 5 March". Some more traditional calendars instead treat Sunday as the first day of the week. ISO 8601 week numbers are found in diaries and are used in business.

=== Date notation in Welsh ===
The day–month–year order is also used in modern Welsh:

- 20 Mai 1999
- 20fed Mai 1999 or 20^{fed} Mai 1999 (The suffix indicates an ordinal number, like "th" in English.)

The month–day–year order (for example "Mai 20, 1999") was previously more common: it is usual to see a Welsh month–day–year date next to an English day–month–year date on a bilingual plaque from the latter half of the 20th century.

"20 Mai 1999" is read as yr ugeinfed o Fai mil naw naw naw with the usual soft mutation of M to F after o ("of"). The year 1999 can be read as either mil naw naw naw (thousand nine nine nine) or un naw naw naw (one nine nine nine).

== Time ==
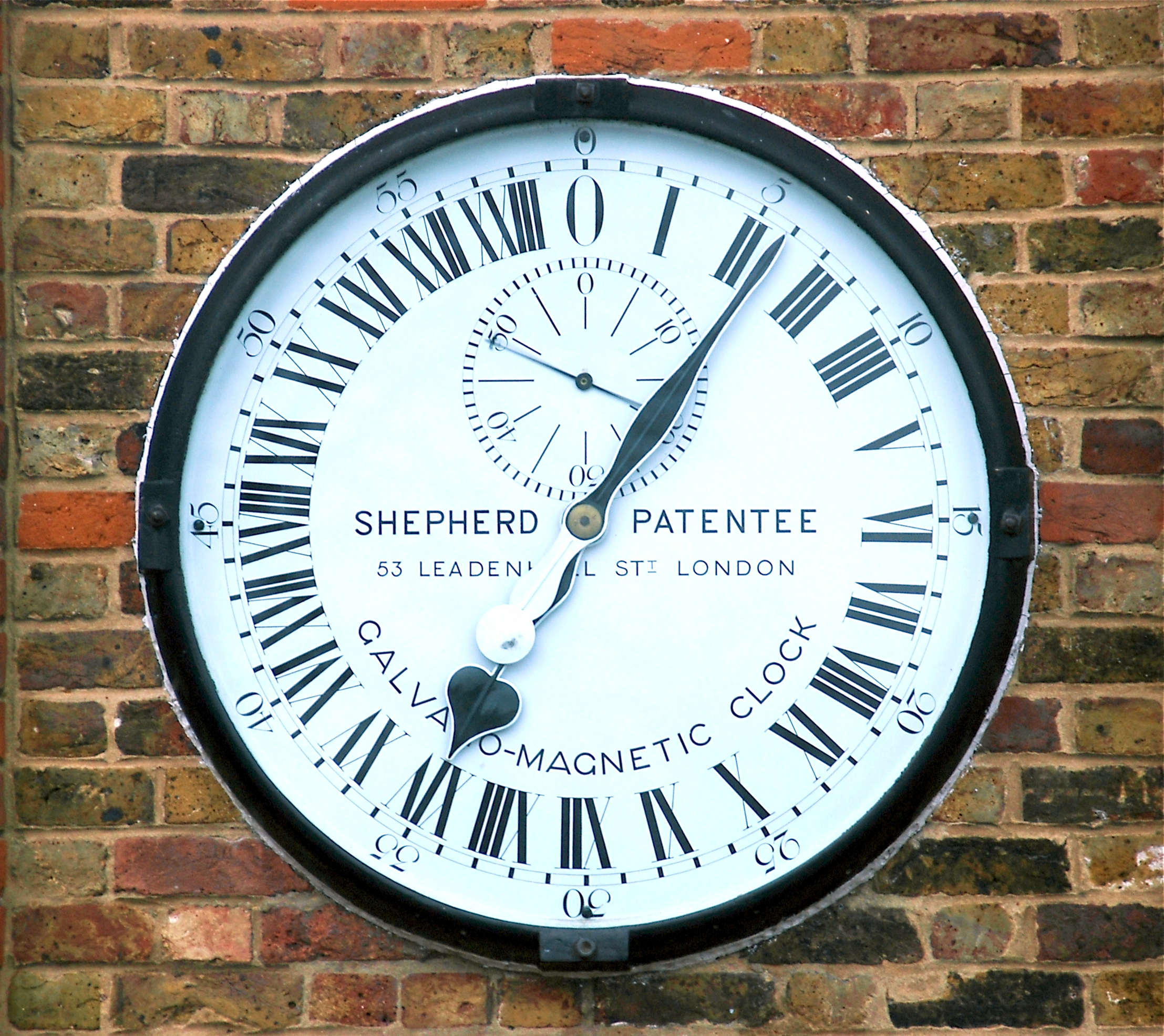
The Shepherd Gate Clock with Roman numbers up to XXIII (23) and 0 for midnight, in Greenwich

=== Time notation in English ===
Both the 24-hour and 12-hour notations are used in the United Kingdom, for example:

- 23:59
- 11.59 p.m.

=== Spoken vs written time ===
The 24-hour notation is used in timetables and on most digital clocks, but 12-hour notation is still widely used in ordinary life. The 24-hour notation is used more often than in North America – transport timetables use it exclusively, as do most legal documents – but not as commonly as in much of the non-English-speaking world.

Although 12-hour style is used “as a default/standard”, when spoken by presenters during live TV and radio broadcasts in the UK (e.g., “Join us again at eight o’clock tonight“), the BBC has been using 24-hour notation in its online radio and TV guides for many years, as do ITV and Channel 5, though Channel 4 still maintains 12-hour notation. The 12-hour format is often used over the 24-hour notation when speaking; 21:30 is colloquially spoken by a native speaker as "half past nine" or "nine thirty" rather than "twenty-one thirty".

The spoken 24-hour format is limited to use in airport and railway station announcements: "We regret to inform that the fifteen hundred [15:00] service from Nottingham is running approximately 10 minutes late"; "The next train arriving at Platform four is the twenty fifteen [20:15] service to London Euston". Like North America but unlike mainland Europe, a leading zero is used for the hour of the 24-hour format, as in 08:30 (read "oh eight thirty").

To separate the hours, minutes and seconds, either a point (full stop) or a colon can be used. For 12-hour time, the point (full stop) format (for example "1.45 p.m.") is in common usage and has been recommended by some style guides, including the academic manual published by Oxford University Press under various titles, as well as the internal house style book for the University of Oxford, that of The Guardian and The Times newspapers.

The colon format (as in "1:45 p.m.") is also recognised and is common in digital devices and applications. The more descriptive 2014 revision of New Hart's Rules concedes that the colon format "is often seen in British usage too", and that either style "is acceptable if applied consistently."

The time-of-day abbreviations (which are generally lowercase only) are handled in various conflicting styles, including "a.m." and "p.m." with a space between the time and the abbreviation ("1.45 p.m."); "am" and "pm" with a space ("1.45 pm" – recognised as an alternative usage by Oxford); and the same without a space ("1.45pm" – primarily found in news writing).

In 24-hour time, a colon is internationally standard (as in "13:45"). Some British news publishers favour "13.45" format instead, such as The Guardian. Some stick with the colon, including the Evening Standard and the BBC. Oxford recognises both styles. The "a.m." and "p.m." abbreviations are not used with 24-hour time in any form.

==== British speech ====
In British English, the expression "half [hour]" is heard colloquially to denote 30 minutes past the hour. For example, "half ten" means 10:30 (a.m. or p.m.). This is an abbreviation of the more formal, "half past ten". The abbreviated form can cause misunderstanding with non-native speakers as this contrasts with many European languages, where the same type of expression denotes 30 minutes before the hour. For example, Czech půl desáté, German halb zehn, Finnish puoli kymmenen, and Swedish halv tio (all literally "half ten") mean 9:30.

The following table shows times written in some common approaches to 12-hour and 24-hour notation, and how each time is typically spoken:

12-hour	24-hour	Spoken
12 midnight	00:00	midnight
6.05 a.m. or 6.5 a.m.	06:05	five past six six oh five; six five
9.18 a.m.	09:18	eighteen minutes past nine nine eighteen
11.15 a.m.	11:15	quarter past eleven eleven fifteen
12 noon or 12 midday	12:00	noon / midday twelve o'clock
4.30 p.m.	16:30	half past four / half four four thirty
5.38 p.m.	17:38	twenty-two minutes to six five thirty-eight
10.35 p.m.	22:35	twenty-five to eleven ten thirty-five

=== Time notation in Welsh ===
The Welsh language usage of the 12-hour and 24-hour clocks is similar to that of UK English above. However, the 24-hour notation has only a written, not a spoken form. For example, written 9:00 and 21:00 (or 09.00, etc.) are said (naw o'r gloch, literally 'nine of the bell'). Minutes are always either wedi ('after') or i ('to') the hour, for example 21:18 deunaw (munud) wedi naw ('eighteen (minutes) past nine') and 21:42 deunaw (munud) i ddeg ('eighteen (minutes) to ten'). Phrases such as y bore ('(of) the morning'), y prynhawn ('(of) the afternoon') and yr hwyr ('(of) the evening') are used to distinguish times in 12-hour notation, much like Latin a.m. and p.m., which are also in common use, for example 9.00yb (09:00) as opposed to 9.00yh (21:00).

== See also ==
- Date format by country
