= Date and time notation in Thailand =

- Full date: 21 พฤศจิกายน 2569
- All-numeric date: 21/11/2569
- Time: 00:40

Thailand has adopted ISO 8601 under national standard: TIS 1111:2535 in 1992. However, Thai date and time notation reflects the country's cultural development through the years used. The formal date format is D/M/YYYY format (1/6/2568), nowadays using the Buddhist Era (BE). The full date format is day-month-year format which is written in Thai (๑ มิถุนายน พ.ศ. ๒๕๖๘ or 1 มิถุนายน พ.ศ. 2568). While a 24-hour system is common for official use, colloquially, a 12-hour format with terms like "morning" (Thai: เช้า, RTGS: chao) and "night" (ค่ำ, kham), etc., or a modified six-hour format is used.

== Date ==
Thailand uses the Thai solar calendar as the official calendar, in which the calendar's epochal date (Year zero) was the year in which the Buddha attained parinibbāna. This places the current year at 543 years ahead of the Gregorian calendar. The year 2026 CE is indicated as 2569 BE in Thailand. Despite adopting ISO 8601, Thai official date is still written in D/M/YYYY formats, such as 30 January 2567 BE (2024 CE) or 30/1/2567. Anno Domini may be used in unofficial context, and is written in the same format (D/M/YYYY).

In full date format, the year is marked with "พ.ศ." (Buddhist Era) or "ค.ศ." (Anno Domini) to avoid confusion. As each calendar is 543 years apart, there is very little confusion in the contemporary context.

=== Day in Thai ===
Day in a week (Thai: สัปดาห์, RTGS: sapda) according to the ISO 8601 international standard, Monday is designated as the first day of the week, while Sunday is considered as the last day. Meanwhile, in Thailand, Sunday was considered the start of the week, which ended on Saturday.

English	Thai	Transliteration (RTGS)	Abbr.
Sunday	วันอาทิตย์	Wan Athit	อา.
Monday	วันจันทร์	Wan Chan	จ.
Tuesday	วันอังคาร	Wan Angkhan	อ.
Wednesday	วันพุธ	Wan Phut	พ.
Thursday	วันพฤหัสบดี	Wan Phruehatsabodi or Pharuehatsabodi	พฤ.
Friday	วันศุกร์	Wan Suk	ศ.
Saturday	วันเสาร์	Wan Sao	ส.

=== Month in Thai ===
In Thai, the names of months can be categorized based on the number of days they contain. Months with 30 days typically end with the suffix -yon (-ยน), while those with 31 days end with -khom (-คม). An exception is February, which is designated with the suffix -phan (-พันธ์) and has either 28 or 29 days depending on whether it is a leap year, as determined by the solar leap year system, referred to as pi athikasuratin (ปีอธิกสุรทิน).

No.	English	Thai	Transliteration (RTGS)	Abbr.
1	January	มกราคม	Makarakhom or Mokkarakhom	ม.ค.
2	February	กุมภาพันธ์	Kumphaphan	ก.พ.
3	March	มีนาคม	Minakhom	มี.ค.
4	April	เมษายน	Mesayon	เม.ย.
5	May	พฤษภาคม	Phruetsaphakhom	พ.ค.
6	June	มิถุนายน	Mithunayon	มิ.ย.
7	July	กรกฎาคม	Karakadakhom or Karakkadakhom	ก.ค.
8	August	สิงหาคม	Singhakhom	ส.ค.
9	September	กันยายน	Kanyayon	ก.ย.
10	October	ตุลาคม	Tulakhom	ต.ค.
11	November	พฤศจิกายน	Phruetsachikayon	พ.ย.
12	December	ธันวาคม	Thanwakhom	ธ.ค.

=== Year in Thai ===
The Thai calendar has evolved significantly throughout the nation's history, from their culture and tradition. Each era has been used to mark the passage of time, reflecting the historical and religious influences of the era.

==== Buddhist Era ====
The lunar calendar (Thai: ปฏิทินจันทรคติ, RTGS: patithin chanthrakhati) system is based on the cycles of the moon. A lunar month lasts about 291/2 days, and the year consists of 12 months with the occasional insertion of an extra month (13th month) to keep the lunar and solar years aligned. Each month is divided into two phases the waxing moon (ข้างขึ้น, khang khuen) and the waning moon (ข้างแรม, khang raem).

The traditional Thai lunar calendar follows the Buddhist Era (พุทธศักราช, phutthasakkarat), which is 543 years ahead of the Gregorian calendar.

Important dates on the Thai calendar were often connected to Buddhism, such as Vesakha Puja (วันวิสาขบูชา, wan wisakhabucha), which commemorates the birth, enlightenment, and passing of the Buddha. These holidays are determined by the lunar calendar.

==== Shaka era ====
Shaka era (Thai: มหาศักราช, RTGS: maha sakkarat) is widely used in historical evidence such as stone inscriptions and chronicles from both the Sukhothai and early Ayutthaya periods. Shaka era was established by King Kanishka of the Kushan dynasty, beginning after the Buddhist Era 622 (Shaka era corresponds to 622 CE).

==== Chula Sakarat ====
Chula Sakarat (Thai: จุลศักราช, RTGS: chunlasakkarat) is an era influenced by Burma. The king of Pagan first started using it in Burma in 1182 CE and it spread to the Lan Na Kingdom starting after 1181 CE. Thais like to use Chula Sakarat in astrological calculations and to indicate the year in inscriptions, legends, records, and chronicles until the time of King Chulalongkorn when he announced its abolition and used Rattanakosin Era instead.

==== Rattanakosin Era ====
The Ratanakosin Era (RS, Thai: รัตนโกสินทรศก, RTGS: Rattanakosinsok) was established on 1 April 1889 by Chulalongkorn, starting with the year Bangkok was declared as the capital as 1 RS. Thailand continued the Rattanakosin Era until 131 RS. It was announced to be canceled during the early reign of King Vajiravudh, eventually being turned into the Buddhist Era instead.

==== Gregorian year ====
The Buddhist calendar is widely used in Southeast Asian countries that follow the Theravada school of Buddhism, particularly in Thailand, Cambodia, Laos, Myanmar, and Sri Lanka. In Thailand, it was formally adopted in 2455 BE (1912 CE), during the reign of Vajiravudh, replacing the Rattanakosin Era. Although it has been in use since the Ayutthaya period, it continues to be used today. The Buddhist Era (BE) starts one year after the Buddha's parinirvana, making the Buddhist calendar 543 years ahead of the Gregorian calendar.

==== Year calculation ====
- Buddhist Era = Anno Domini + 543
- Buddhist Era = Maha Sakarat + 621
- Buddhist Era = Chula Sakarat + 1181
- Buddhist Era = Rattanakosin Era + 2324

=== Thai numerals in Thai official document ===
Thai numerals are commonly used in official government documents in Thailand for conserving Thai cultures and it is in a day month year format by day and year are written in Thai numerals and month is written in Thai. Additionally, in the official documents, year is written in the Buddhist era. For example, to write a full date format, 1 June 2013, in Thai government documents, ๑ มิถุนายน พ.ศ. ๒๕๕๖.

Arabic	Thai numerals	Transliteration (RTGS)	Thai
0	๐	sun	ศูนย์
1	๑	nueng	หนึ่ง
2	๒	song	สอง
3	๓	sam	สาม
4	๔	si	สี่
5	๕	ha	ห้า
6	๖	hok	หก
7	๗	chet	เจ็ด
8	๘	paet	แปด
9	๙	kao	เก้า
10	๑๐	sip	สิบ

=== Colloquialism in Thailand ===
==== Date colloquialism in Thailand ====
The time points of days in the past, present, and future, which are found in the Thai language, are expressed using various words, including:

- Past:
  - "เมื่อวาน" (RTGS: muea wan) refers to yesterday or one day before today.
  - "เมื่อวานซืน" (RTGS: muea wan suen) refers to the day before yesterday or two days before today.
- Present:
  - "วันนี้" (RTGS: wan ni) refers to today.
- Future:
  - "พรุ่งนี้" (RTGS: phrung ni) refers to tomorrow or one day after today.
  - "มะรืนนี้" (RTGS: maruen ni) refers to the day after tomorrow or two days after today.
  - "มะเรื่อง" (RTGS: marueang) refers to three days after today.

==== Month colloquialism ====
The time points of months in the past, present and future, which are found in Thai language, are expressed using many words, including:

- Past:
  - "เดือนที่ผ่านมา" (RTGS: duean thi phan ma) refers to previous month or last month.
  - "เดือนที่แล้ว" (RTGS: duean thi laeo) refers to previous month or last month.
  - "เดือนก่อน" (RTGS: duean kon) refers to previous month or last month.
  - "เดือนที่แล้วมา" (RTGS: duean kon) refers to a month that came before the last month but does not specify an exact time frame.
- Present:
  - "เดือนนี้" (RTGS: duean ni) refers to this month.
- Future:
  - "เดือนหน้า" (RTGS: duean na) refers to next month or one month after the current month.
  - "เดือนถัดไป" (RTGS: duean that pai) refers to next month or one month after the current month.
  - "เดือนหน้านู้น" (RTGS: duean na nun) or "เดือนหน้าหน้า" (RTGS: duean na na) refers to the month two months from now, two months after the current month or more.

==== Year colloquialism ====
The time points of years in the past, present and future, which are found in Thai language, are expressed using many words, including:

- Past:
  - "ปีก่อน" (RTGS: pi kon) refers to the year before last or one year before the current year.
  - "ปีที่แล้ว" (RTGS: pi thi laeo) refers to the year before last or one year before the current year.
  - "ปีกลาย" (RTGS: pi klai) refers to more than one year before the current year, but it does not specify exactly how many years ago.
- Present:
  - "ปีนี้" (RTGS: pi ni) refers to this year.
- Future:
  - "ปีหน้า" (RTGS: pi na) refers to next year or one year after the current year.
  - "ปีถัดไป" (RTGS: pi that pai) refers to next year or one year after the current year.

== Time ==
There are two systems of telling time in Thailand. Official time follows a 24-hour clock. The 24-hour clock is commonly used in military, aviation, navigation, meteorology, astronomy, computing, logistical, emergency services, and hospital settings, where the ambiguities of the 12-hour clock cannot be tolerated.

In the second, everyday usage, the day is divided into four six-hour periods. Additional words are used to identify the period specified (similar to a.m. or p.m. for a 12-hour system).

The distinguishing words are:

- 00:00-00:59 = เที่ยงคืน (RTGS: thiang khuen)
- 01:00-05:59 = ตี (RTGS: ti)
- 06:00-11:59 = โมงเช้า (RTGS: mong chao)
- 12:00-12:59 = เที่ยง (RTGS: thiang)
- 13:00-15:59 = บ่ายโมง (RTGS: bai mong)
- 16:00-18:59 = โมงเย็น (RTGS: mong yen)
- 19:00-23:59 = ทุ่ม (RTGS: thum)

Thailand is in the UTC+07:00 time zone, which is also known as Indochina Time (ICT) and military time zone Golf.

=== Thai six-hour clock ===
The Thai six-hour clock divides the day into four distinct 6-hour periods and reflects traditional Thai customs. While modern Thailand primarily uses the 24-hour clock for official purposes, this system remains a cultural heritage from earlier Thai norms. It is still occasionally used in informal settings, especially in rural areas and casual conversation.

Notation of the Thai time system:

- The first six-hour period (01:00–06:00) is expressed using the numbers 1 through 6, followed by the phrase "ตี" (ti).
- The second six-hour period (07:00–12:59) is expressed using the numbers 1 through 6, followed by the phrase "โมงเช้า" (mong chao).
- The third six-hour period (13:00–18:59) is expressed using the numbers 1 through 6, followed by the phrase "บ่าย" (bai) or "โมงเย็น" (mong yen).
- The fourth six-hour period (19:00–00:59) is expressed using the numbers 1 through 6, followed by the phrase "ทุ่ม" (thum).

The terms mong and thum originate from the sounds produced by traditional Thai instruments: the gong and the drum, respectively. These sounds were historically used as signals to mark the passage of time. mong represents the sound of the gong, associated with signaling the day, while thum represents the sound of the drum, used to signify the night. This system of timekeeping was formalized during the reign of King Mongkut.

=== Thai 24-hour clock ===
The 24-hour clock in Thai is used similarly to the international system, especially in formal contexts like transportation, news, military, and government. By expressing 00:00-23:59, followed by the phase "นาฬิกา" (RTGS: nalika)

24-hour numerical notation	Time	Modified 6-hour		24-hour	
24-hour numerical notation	Time	Thai	RTGS	Thai	RTGS
24:00 or 00:00	Midnight	เที่ยงคืน	thiang khuen	ยี่สิบสี่นาฬิกา or ศูนย์นาฬิกา	yi sip si nalika or sun nalika
01:00	1 early morning	ตีหนึ่ง	ti nueng	หนึ่งนาฬิกา	nueng nalika
02:00	2 early morning	ตีสอง	ti song	สองนาฬิกา	song nalika
03:00	3 early morning	ตีสาม	ti sam	สามนาฬิกา	sam nalika
04:00	4 early morning	ตีสี่	ti si	สี่นาฬิกา	si nalika
05:00	5 early morning	ตีห้า	ti ha	ห้านาฬิกา	ha nalika
06:00	6 in the morning	หกโมงเช้า	hok mong chao	หกนาฬิกา	hok nalika
07:00	7 in the morning	เจ็ดโมงเช้า	chet mong chao	เจ็ดนาฬิกา	chet nalika
08:00	8 in the morning	แปดโมงเช้า	paet mong chao	แปด นาฬิกา	paet nalika
09:00	9 in the morning	เก้าโมงเช้า	kao mong chao	เก้านาฬิกา	kao nalika
10.00	10 in the morning	สิบโมงเช้า	sip mong chao	สิบ นาฬิกา	sip nalika
11.00	11 in the morning	สิบเอ็ดโมงเช้า	sip et mong chao	สิบเอ็ด นาฬิกา	sip et nalika
12:00	Midday	เที่ยงวัน	thiang wan	สิบสองนาฬิกา	sip song nalika
13:00	1 in the afternoon	บ่ายโมง	bai mong	สิบสามนาฬิกา	sip sam nalika
14:00	2 in the afternoon	บ่ายสองโมง	bai song mong	สิบสี่นาฬิกา	sip si nalika
15:00	3 in the afternoon	บ่ายสามโมง	bai sam mong	สิบห้านาฬิกา	sip ha nalika
16:00	4 in the afternoon	บ่ายสี่โมง	bai si mong	สิบหกนาฬิกา	sip hok nalika
17:00	5 in the afternoon	ห้าโมงเย็น	ha mong yen	สิบเจ็ดนาฬิกา	sip chet nalika
18:00	6 in the evening	หกโมงเย็น	hok mong yen	สิบแปดนาฬิกา	sip paet nalika
19:00	1 at night	หนึ่งทุ่ม	nueng thum	สิบเก้านาฬิกา	sip kao nalika
20:00	2 at night	สองทุ่ม	song thum	ยี่สิบนาฬิกา	yi sip nalika
21:00	3 at night	สามทุ่ม	sam thum	ยี่สิบเอ็ดนาฬิกา	yi sip et nalika
22:00	4 at night	สี่ทุ่ม	si thum	ยี่สิบสองนาฬิกา	yi sip song nalika
23:00	5 at night	ห้าทุ่ม	ha thum	ยี่สิบสามนาฬิกา	yi sip sam nalika

== See also ==
- Thai calendar
- Thai lunar calendar
- Thai solar calendar
- Thai six-hour clock
