= 105th meridian =

105th meridian may refer to:

- 105th meridian east, a line of longitude east of the Greenwich Meridian
- 105th meridian west, a line of longitude west of the Greenwich Meridian

105th meridian west	105th meridian east
