= 104th meridian =

104th meridian may refer to:

- 104th meridian east, a line of longitude east of the Greenwich Meridian
- 104th meridian west, a line of longitude west of the Greenwich Meridian

104th meridian west	104th meridian east
