= 76th meridian =

76th meridian may refer to:

- 76th meridian east, a line of longitude east of the Greenwich Meridian
- 76th meridian west, a line of longitude west of the Greenwich Meridian

76th meridian west	76th meridian east
