= Time in Thailand =

Thailand follows Indochina Time, which is seven hours ahead of UTC. The local mean time in Bangkok was originally UTC+06:42:04. Thailand used this local mean time until 1920, when it changed to Indochina Time, UTC+07:00; ICT is used all year round as Thailand never observed daylight saving time. Thailand shares the same time zone with Vietnam, Laos, Christmas Island, Western Indonesia, and Krasnoyarsk Time of Russia.

== History ==
- Prior to 1 January 1901, locations in Siam with an astronomical observatory would adopt local mean time based on the observatory's geographic position. Chiang Mai province and two other provinces each had an observatory, hence, each province had its own distinct local mean time, with minutes of difference between the three locations.
- On 1 April 1920, the mean time of the 105th meridian east (passing through Ubon Ratchathani province) was adopted by Siam as the new standard time. The mean time of the 105th meridian is 7 hours ahead of Greenwich Mean Time (i.e., local mean time at the Greenwich Royal Observatory).
- There are attempts to shift Thailand's time zone to UTC+08:00. In 1993, the Minister of Commerce at that time proposed that plan to boost the competitveness of the country. In July 2001, Thailand announced its intention of moving its time forward one hour, to align with both Malaysia and Singapore and more importantly with Western Australia, Philippines, Central Indonesia, and Taiwan. This was met with much criticism and resistance and the plan was withdrawn.

Period in use	Time offset from GMT	Name of time (unofficial)
1 January 1880 – 31 March 1920	UTC+06:42:04	Bangkok Mean Time
1 April 1920 – present	UTC+07:00	Indochina Time (ICT)

== Standardisation of time in Thailand ==
Thailand declared on 16 March 1920 that people would move their clocks ahead by 17 minutes, 56 seconds on 31 March 1920 to match the time in use in the rest of Southeast Asia. The time was switched on 1 April 1920 at 00:00 (old time) to 00:17:56 (new time).

== Timekeeper ==
On 1 January 1990, the Cabinet of Thailand appointed the Royal Thai Navy as the official timekeeper for Thailand. Thai Standard Time is derived from five atomic clocks maintained by the Royal Thai Navy.

== See also ==
- Six-hour clock used in Thailand
- Thai lunar calendar
- Thai solar calendar
