= Thai calendar =

Solar and lunar calendars used in Thailand

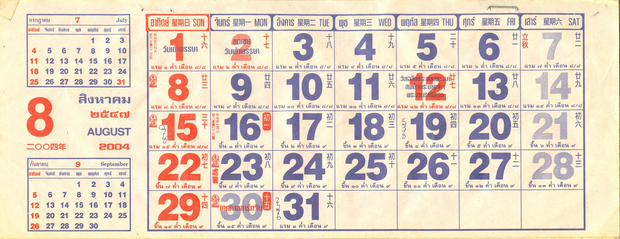
A panel from a typical Sino-Thai calendar, showing the solar powered calendar month of August 2004 (B.E. 2547), as well as dates according to the Thai and Chinese lunar calendars

In Thailand, two main calendar systems are used alongside each other: the Thai solar calendar, based on the Gregorian calendar and used for official and most day-to-day purposes, and the Thai lunar calendar (a version of the Buddhist calendar, technically a lunisolar calendar), used for traditional events and Buddhist religious practices.

== History ==
The use of the solar-based calendar was introduced in 1889 by King Chulalongkorn (Rama V), replacing the lunar calendar in official contexts. The beginning of the year was originally marked as April 1, however this was changed to January 1 in 1941. The days and months now correspond exactly to the Gregorian calendar. The years follow the Buddhist Era, introduced in 1913 to replace the Rattanakosin Era, which in turn replaced the Chula Sakarat in 1889. The reckoning of the Buddhist Era in Thailand is 543 years ahead of the Gregorian calendar (Anno Domini), so the year 2026 AD corresponds to B.E. 2569.

== Usage ==
The lunar calendar contains 12 or 13 months in a year, with 15 waxing moon and 14 or 15 waning moon days in a month, amounting to years of 354, 355 or 384 days. The years are usually noted by the animal of the Chinese zodiac, although there are several dates used to count the New Year.

As with the rest of the world, the seven-day week is used alongside both calendars. The solar calendar now governs most aspects of life in Thailand, and while official state documents invariably follow the Buddhist Era, the Common Era is also used by the private sector. The lunar calendar determines the dates of Buddhist holidays, traditional festivals and astrological practices, and the lunar date is still recorded on birth certificates and printed in most daily newspapers.

== Calendars ==
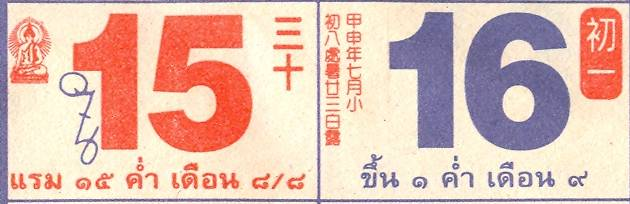
Thai (left) and Chinese (right) holy days.

- Red numerals mark Sundays and public holidays in Thailand.
- Buddha images mark Buddhist Sabbaths, Wan Phra (วันพระ).
- Red tablets with white Chinese characters mark the New and Full Moons of the Chinese calendar, which typically differ by one day from those of the Thai.
- Thai lunar calendar dates appear below the solar calendar date.

== Birthdays ==
Mundane astrology figures prominently in Thai culture, so modern Thai birth certificates include lunar calendar dates, and the appropriate Chinese calendar zodiacal animal year-name for both Thai Hora (โหราศาสตร์, ho-ra-sat) and Chinese astrology. Thai birth certificates record the date, month and time of birth, followed by the day of the week, lunar date, and the applicable zodiac animal name. Thai traditionally reckon age by the 12-year animal-cycle names, with the twelfth and sixtieth anniversaries being of special significance; but the official calendar determines age at law.

For instance, 12 August 2004 was observed without regard to the lunar date as Queen Sirikit's birthday, a public holiday also observed as Thai Mother's Day. Her zodiacal animal is the Monkey and her traditionally significant sixtieth anniversary year was 1992. Born on a Friday, her auspicious birthday colour is blue. Thai auspicious colours of the day are given in the table of weekdays, followed below it by a link to the Buddha images for each day of the week.

== Weeks ==
A week (สัปดาห์, sapda or सप्ताह, สัปดาหะ, sapdaha from Sanskrit "seven") is a 7-day period beginning on Sunday and ending Saturday.

Days of the week are named after the first seven of the nine Indian astrological Navagraha; i.e., the sun, moon, and five classical planets.

Weekdays
English name	Thai script	Transliteration (RTGS)	IPA transcription	Colour	Sanskrit word	Planet
Sunday	วันอาทิตย์	wan athit	[wān ʔāː.tʰít]	red	Aditya	Sun
Monday	วันจันทร์	wan chan	[wān tɕān]	yellow	Chandra	Moon
Tuesday	วันอังคาร	wan angkhan	[wān ʔāŋ.kʰāːn]	pink	Angaraka	Mars
Wednesday	วันพุธ	wan phut	[wān pʰút]	green	Budha	Mercury
Thursday	วันพฤหัสบดี	wan phruehatsabodi	[wān pʰrɯ́ʔ.hàt.sā.bɔ̄ː.dīː]	orange	Brihaspati	Jupiter
Friday	วันศุกร์	wan suk	[wān sùk]	blue	Shukra	Venus
Saturday	วันเสาร์	wan sao	[wān sǎw]	purple	Shani	Saturn

Note: Colours are those considered auspicious for the given days of the week, that of Wednesday day being green and of Wednesday night, light green. Of Buddha images representing episodes (ปาง) from his life, there is one that represents a week and others for each day of the week: Monday has three options that are similar and Wednesday, entirely different ones for day and night.

Thai representations of the planets in deity form are below:

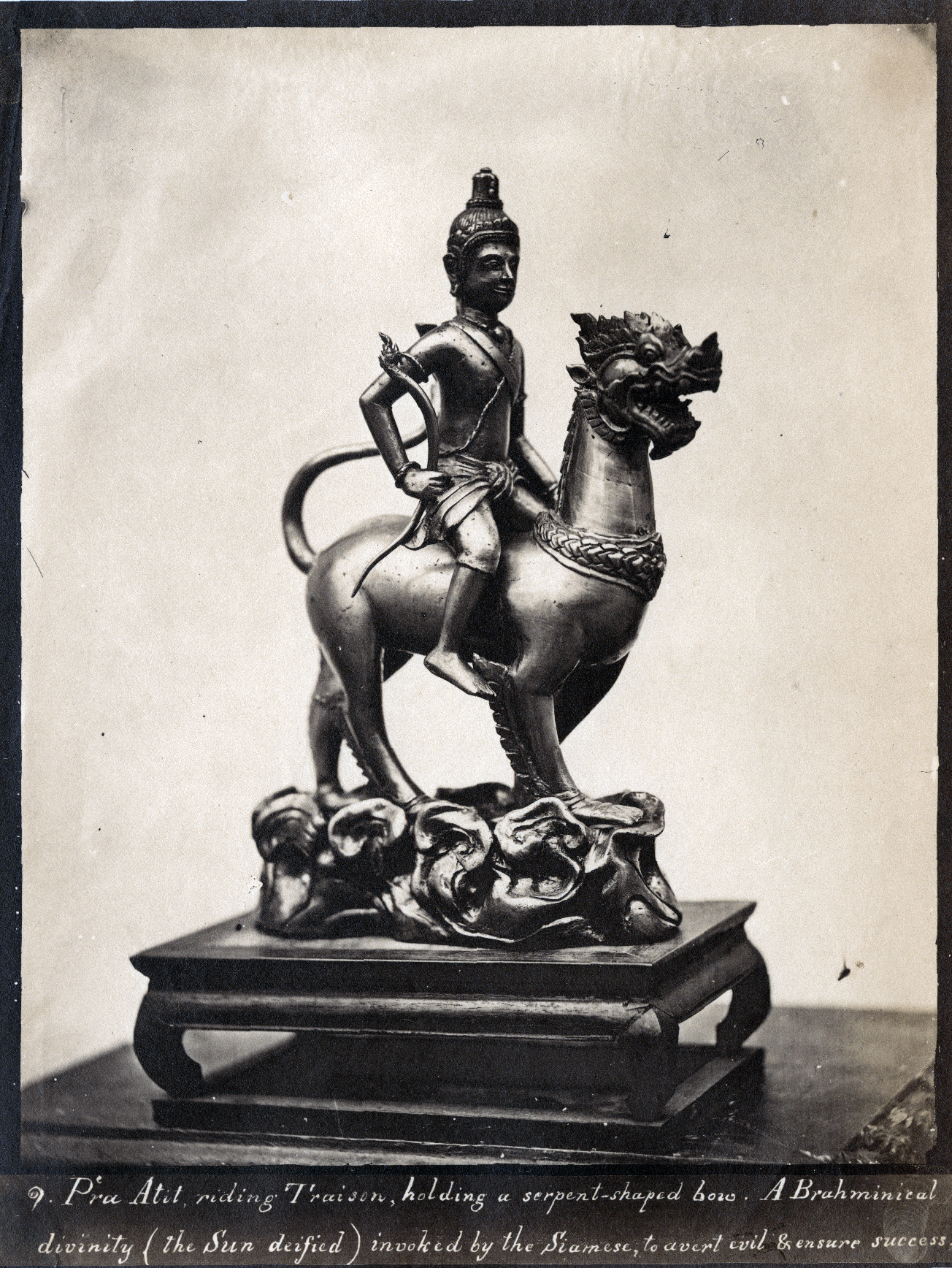
Phra Athit

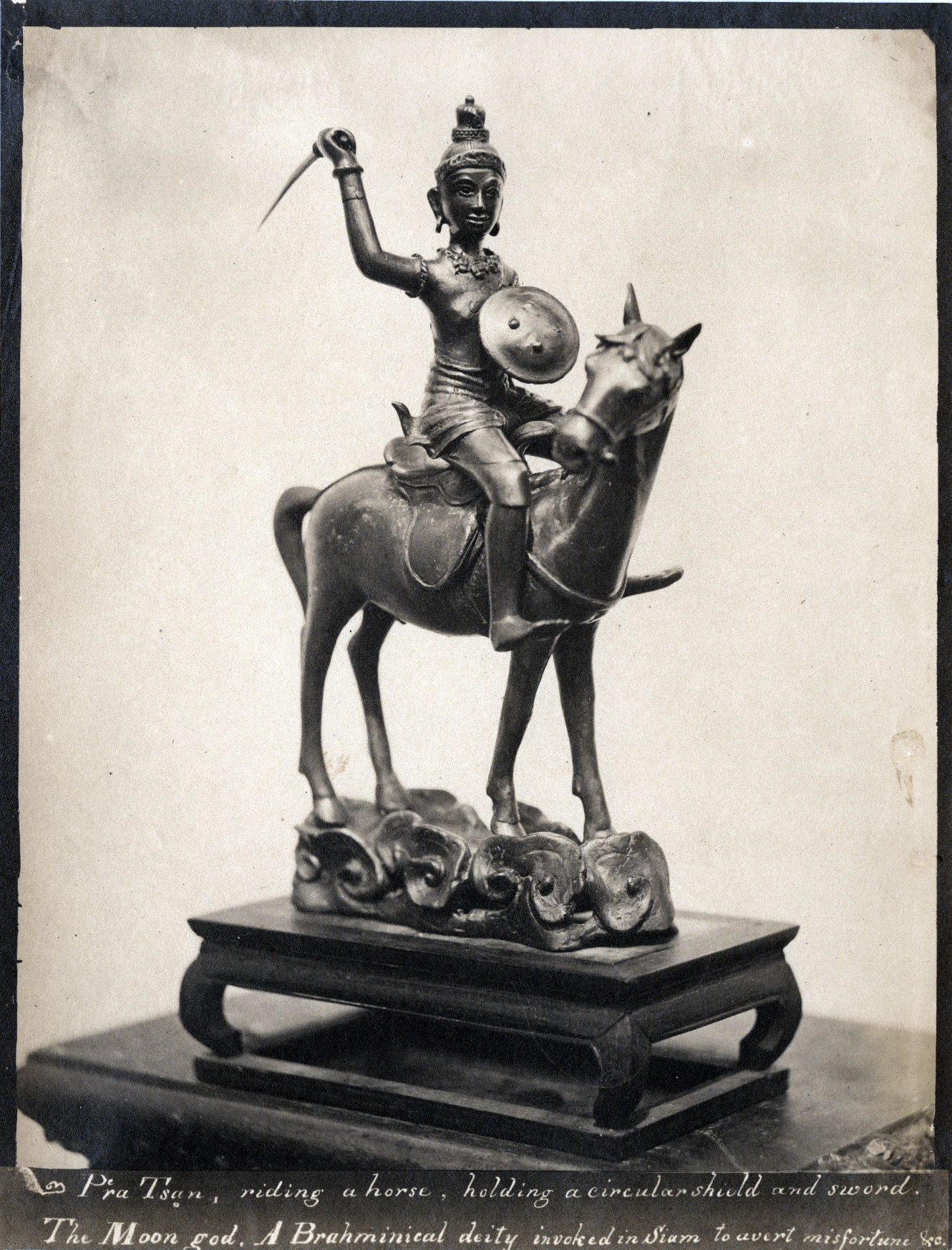
Phra Chan

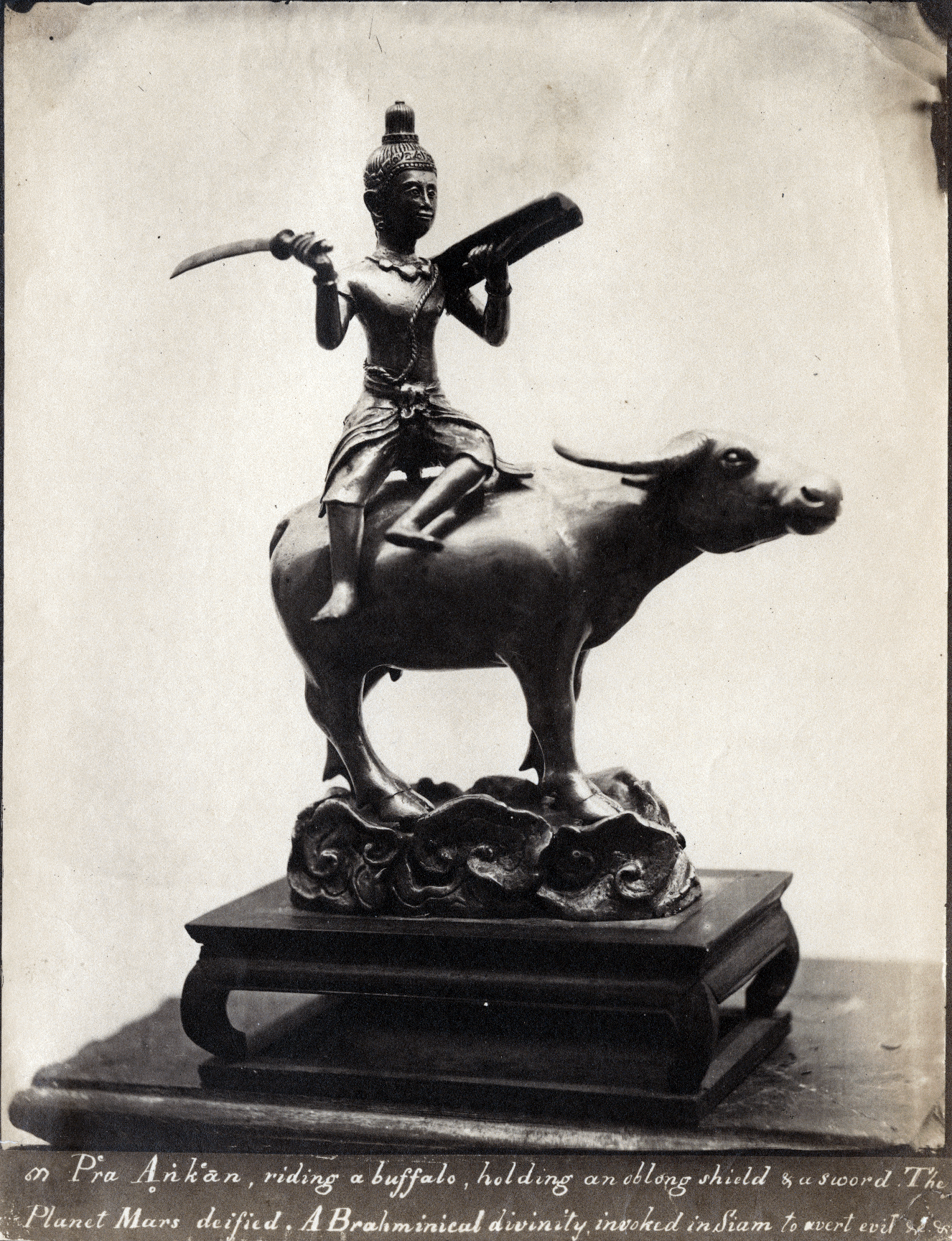
Phra Angkhan

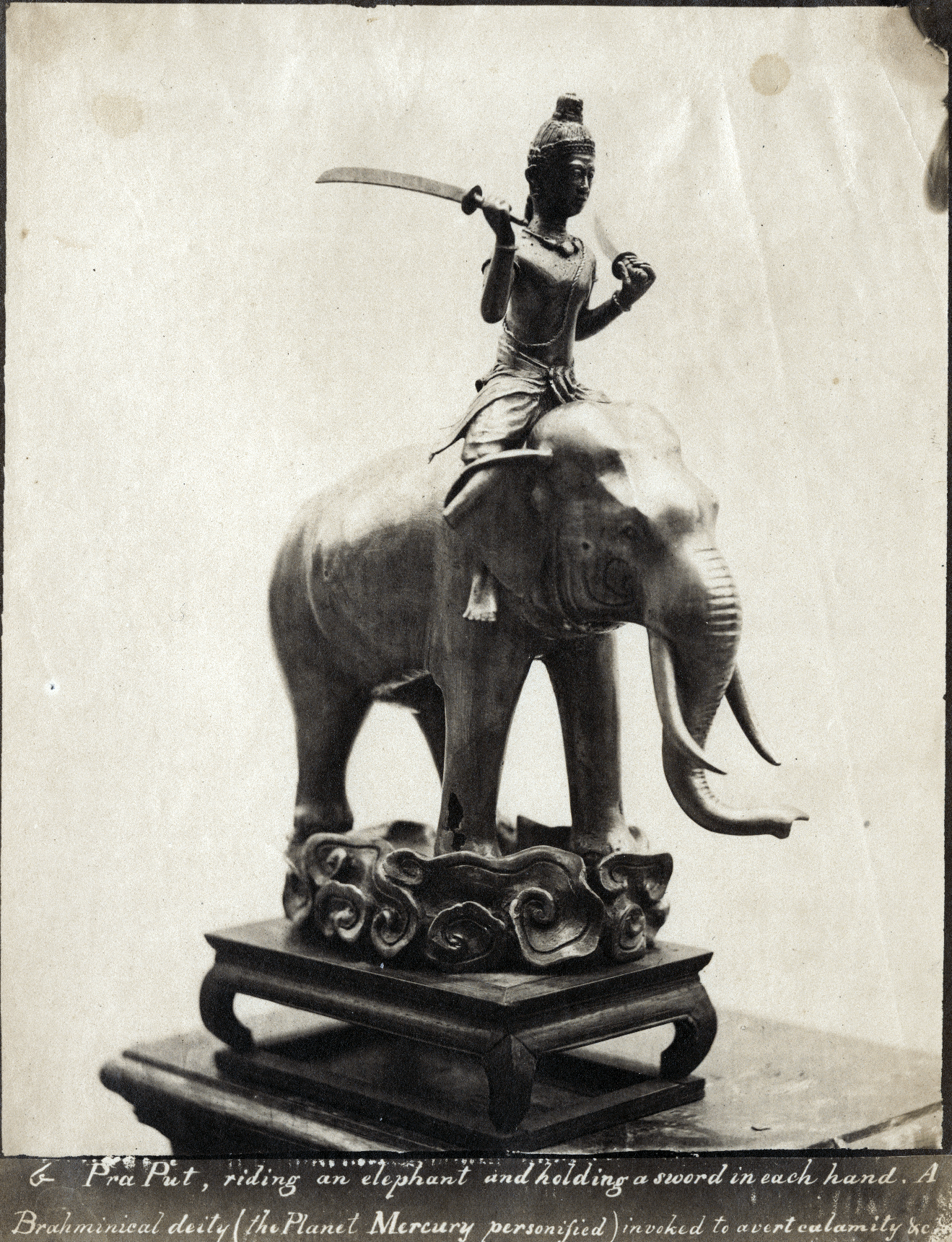
Phra Phut

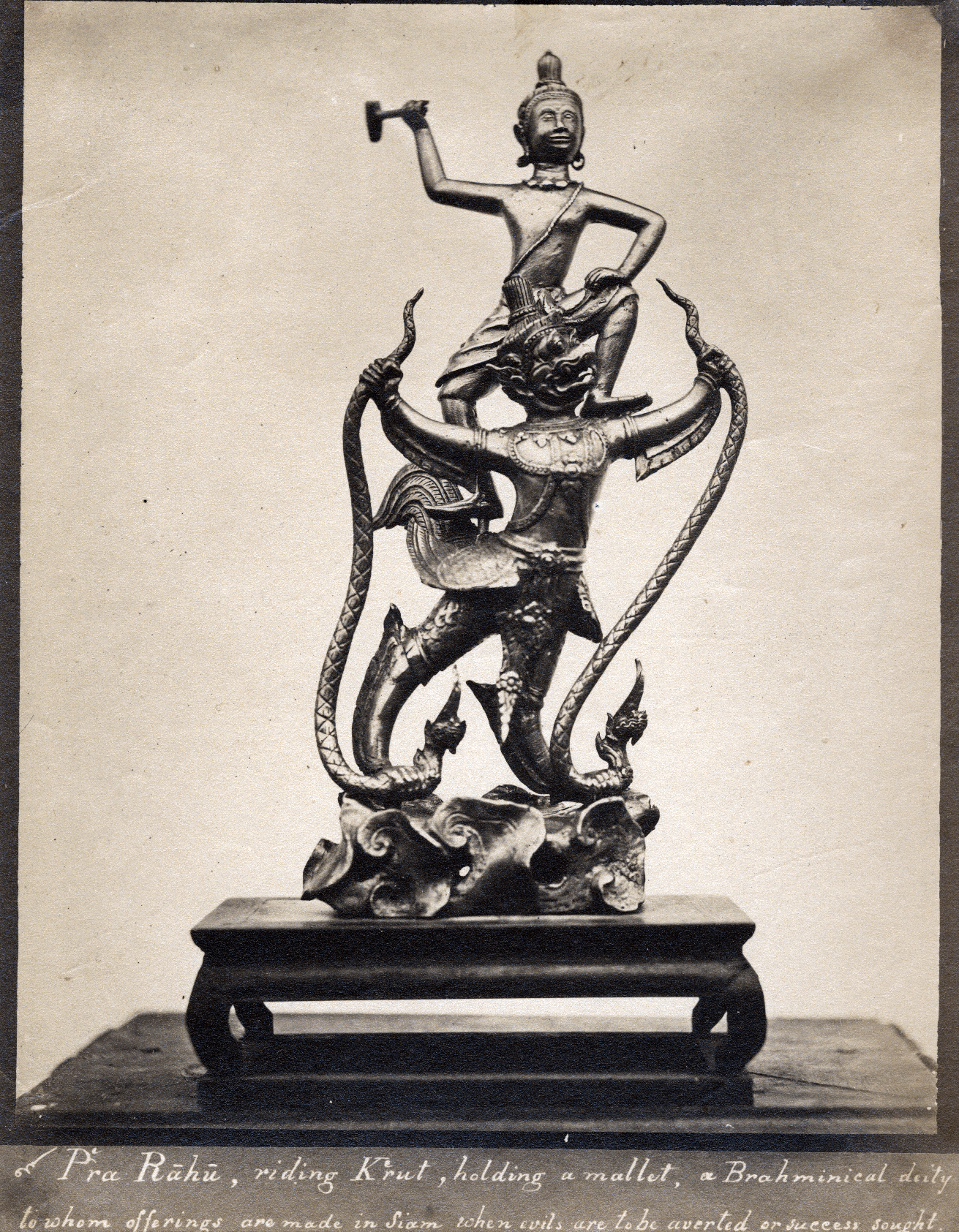
Phra Rahu

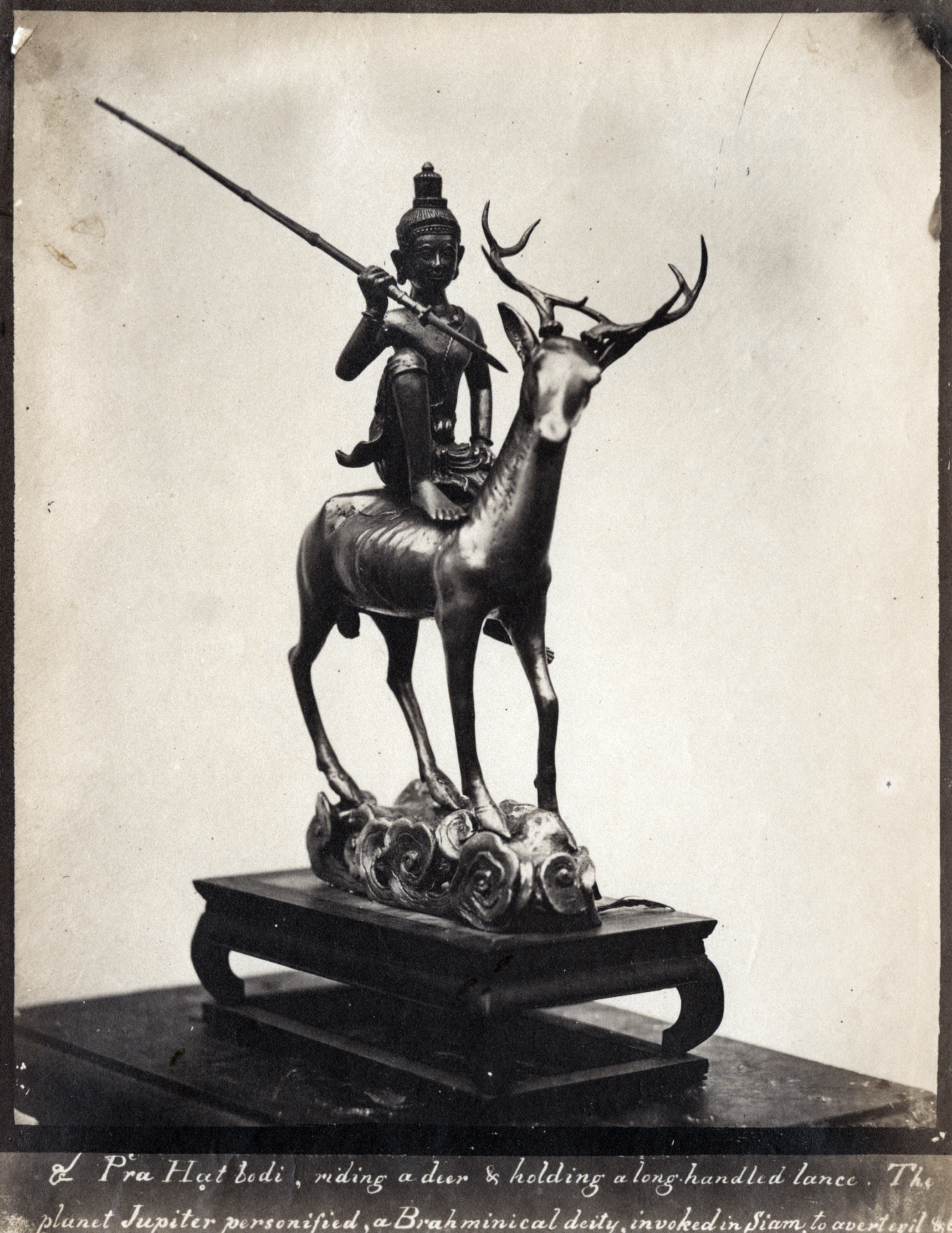
Phra Phruehat

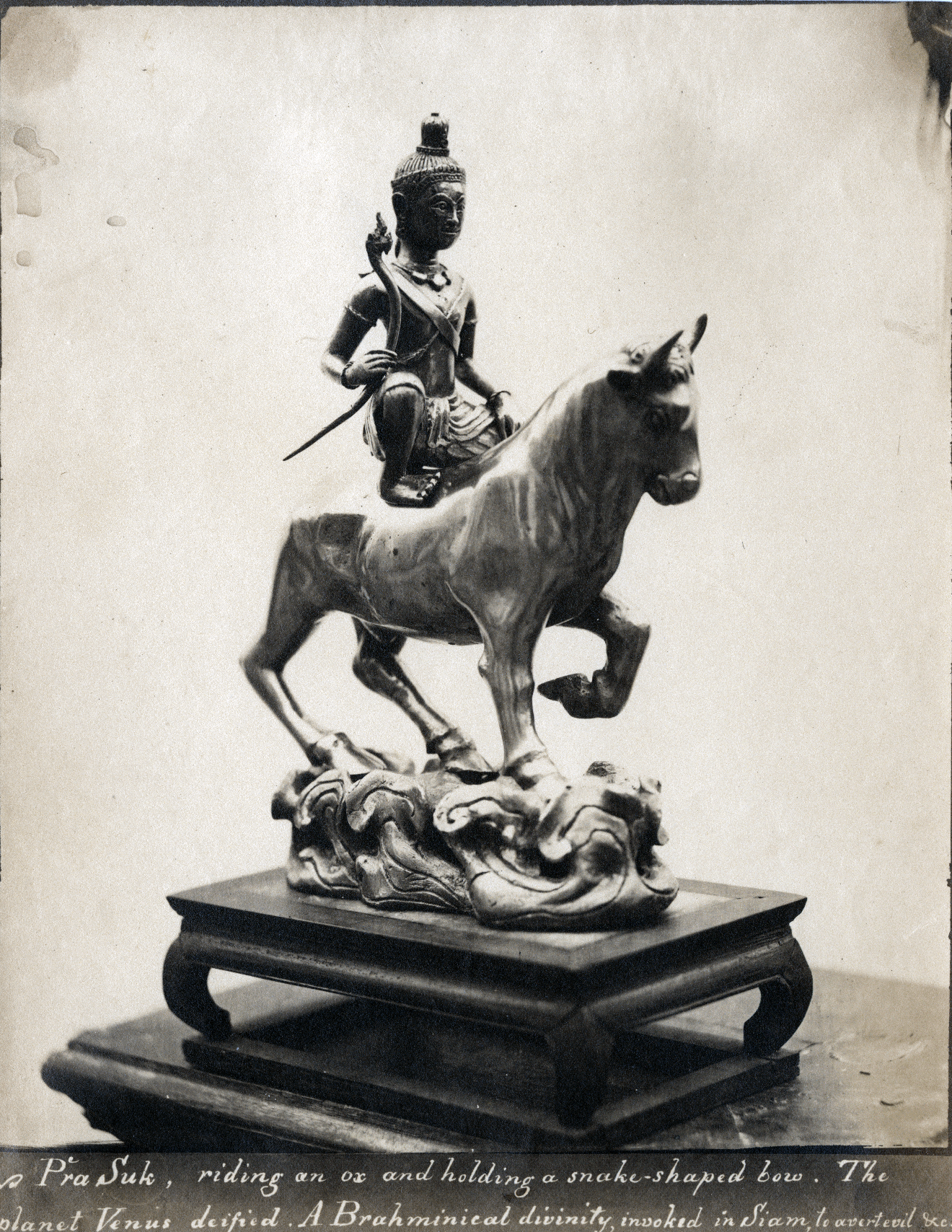
Phra Suk

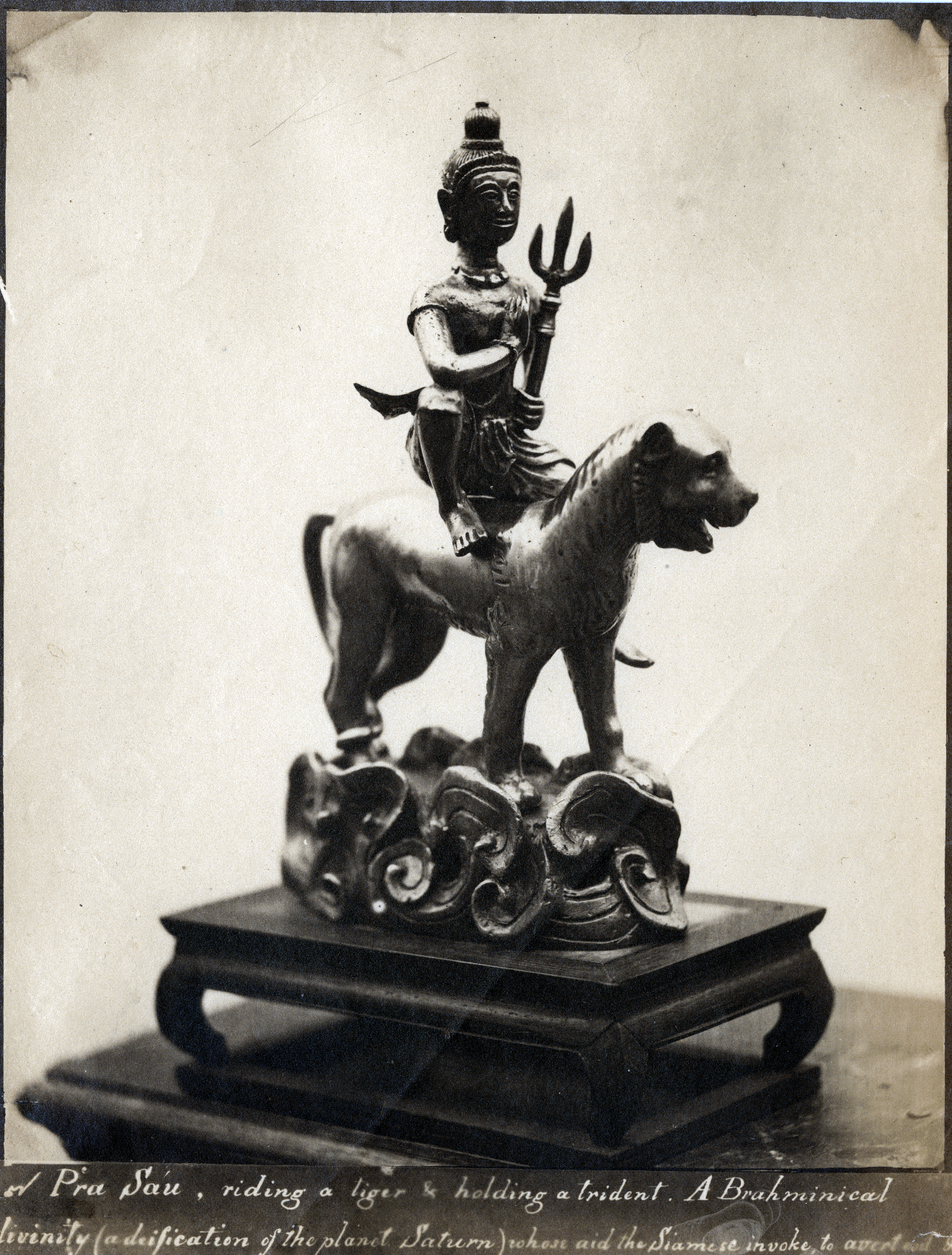
Phra Sao

=== Weekends and holidays ===
Saturdays and Sundays (Thai: เสาร์-อาทิตย์ sao athit) are observed as legal non-workdays (วันหยุดราชการ, wan yut ratchakan) and are generally shown on calendars in red, as are public holidays. Since 1996 and subject to declaration by the Cabinet of Thailand, public holidays that fall on weekends are followed by substitution days (วันหยุดชดเชย, wan yut chotchoei) generally shown in a lighter shade of red, as shown above for Monday, 2 August 2004. Buddhist feasts that are public holidays are calculated according to the Thai lunar calendar, so their dates change every year with respect to the solar calendar. Lunar New Year and other feasts observed by Thai Chinese vary with respect to both, as these are calculated according to the Chinese calendar.

== See also ==
- Date and time notation in Thailand
- Thai solar calendar
