= Thai six-hour clock =

Thai timekeeping system

The six-hour clock (Thai: นาฬิกาหกชั่วโมง) is a traditional timekeeping system used in the Thai and formerly the Lao language and the Khmer language, alongside the official 24-hour clock. Like other common systems, it counts twenty-four hours in a day, but it divides the day into four quarters, counting six hours in each. The hours in each quarter (with the exception of the sixth hour in each quarter) are told with period-designating words or phrases, which are:

- ... mong chao (Thai: ...โมงเช้า, [mōːŋ tɕʰáːw]) for the first half of daytime (07:00 to 12:59)
- Bai ... mong (บ่าย...โมง, [bàːj mōːŋ]) for the second half of daytime (13:00 to 18:59)
- ... thum (...ทุ่ม, [tʰûm]) for the first half of nighttime (19:00 to 00:59)
- Ti ... (ตี..., [tīː]) for the second half of nighttime (01:00 to 06:59)

These terms are thought to have originated from the sounds of traditional timekeeping devices. The gong was used to announce the hours in daytime, and the drum at night. Hence the terms mong, an onomatopoeia of the sound of the gong, and thum, that of the sound of the drum. Ti is a verb meaning to hit or strike, and is presumed to have originated from the act of striking the timekeeping device itself. Chao and bai translate as morning and afternoon respectively, and help to differentiate the two daytime quarters.

The sixth hours of each quarter are told by a different set of terms. The sixth hour at dawn is called yam rung (ย่ำรุ่ง, [jâm rûŋ]), and the sixth hour at dusk is called yam kham (ย่ำค่ำ, [jâm kʰâm]), both references to the act of striking the gong or drum in succession to announce the turning of day (yam), where rung and kham, meaning dawn and dusk, denote the time of these occurrences. The midday and midnight hours are respectively known as thiang (เที่ยง, [tʰîaŋ], or thiang wan, เที่ยงวัน, [tʰîaŋ wān]) and thiang khuen (เที่ยงคืน, tʰîaŋ kʰɯ̄ːn), both of which literally translate as midday and midnight.

Midnight is also called song yam (สองยาม, [sɔ̌ːŋ jāːm]; note that yam is a different word), a reference to the end of the second three-hour period of the night watch (song translates as the number two). In addition, hok (6) thum and ti hok may also be used to refer to the hours of midnight and dawn, following general usage for the other hours, although more rarely; and the fourth to sixth hours of the second daytime half may also be told as ...mong yen (...โมงเย็น, [mōːŋ jēn]), yen meaning evening.

The system has been used in some form since the days of the Ayutthaya Kingdom, but was codified similarly to its present form only in 1901 by King Chulalongkorn in Royal Gazette 17:206. Nowadays, it is used only in colloquial speech. However, a corrupted form of the six-hour clock is more frequently encountered, where usually the first half of daytime (including the sixth hour of the preceding quarter) is counted as in the twelve-hour clock, i.e. hok (6) mong chao, chet (7) mong, etc., up to sip et (11) mong.

The six-hour clock system was abolished in Laos and Cambodia during the French protectorate, and the French 24-hour clock system (for example, 3h00) has been used since.

== Clock format ==
A comparison of the systems is as follows:

Meaning	6-hour		Modified 6-hour		24-hour	12-hour
Meaning	Thai script	Transliteration (RTGS)	Thai script	Transliteration (RTGS)	24-hour	12-hour
1 in the postmidnight	ตีหนึ่ง	ti nueng	ตีหนึ่ง	ti nueng	01:00	1:00 am
2 in the postmidnight	ตีสอง	ti song	ตีสอง	ti song	02:00	2:00 am
3 in the postmidnight	ตีสาม	ti sam	ตีสาม	ti sam	03:00	3:00 am
4 in the postmidnight	ตีสี่	ti si	ตีสี่	ti si	04:00	4:00 am
5 in the postmidnight	ตีห้า	ti ha	ตีห้า	ti ha	05:00	5:00 am
6 in the morning	ตีหก, ย่ำรุ่ง	ti hok, yam rung	ตีหก, หกโมงเช้า	ti hok, hok mong chao	06:00	6:00 am
1 in the morning	โมงเช้า	mong chao	เจ็ดโมง (เช้า)^{*}	chet mong (chao)^{*}	07:00	7:00 am
2 in the morning	สองโมงเช้า	song mong chao	แปดโมง (เช้า)^{*}	paet mong (chao)^{*}	08:00	8:00 am
3 in the morning	สามโมงเช้า	sam mong chao	เก้าโมง (เช้า)^{*}	kao mong (chao)^{*}	09:00	9:00 am
4 in the morning	สี่โมงเช้า	si mong chao	สิบโมง (เช้า)^{*}	sip mong (chao)^{*}	10:00	10:00 am
5 in the morning	ห้าโมงเช้า	ha mong chao	สิบเอ็ดโมง (เช้า)^{*}	sip et mong (chao)^{*}	11:00	11:00 am
midday noon	เที่ยงวัน	thiang wan	เที่ยงวัน	thiang wan	12:00	12:00 pm
1 in the afternoon	บ่ายโมง	bai mong	บ่ายโมง	bai mong	13:00	1:00 pm
2 in the afternoon	บ่ายสองโมง	bai song mong	บ่ายสองโมง	bai song mong	14:00	2:00 pm
3 in the afternoon	บ่ายสามโมง	bai sam mong	บ่ายสามโมง	bai sam mong	15:00	3:00 pm
4 in the afternoon	บ่ายสี่โมง	bai si mong	บ่ายสี่โมง^{**}	bai si mong^{**}	16:00	4:00 pm
5 in the afternoon	บ่ายห้าโมง	bai ha mong	บ่ายห้าโมง^{**}	bai ha mong^{**}	17:00	5:00 pm
6 in the evening	หกโมงเย็น, ย่ำค่ำ	hok mong yen, yam kham	หกโมงเย็น	hok mong yen	18:00	6:00 pm
1 in the evening	หนึ่งทุ่ม	nueng thum	หนึ่งทุ่ม	nueng thum	19:00	7:00 pm
2 in the evening	สองทุ่ม	song thum	สองทุ่ม	song thum	20:00	8:00 pm
3 in the evening	สามทุ่ม	sam thum	สามทุ่ม	sam thum	21:00	9:00 pm
4 in the evening	สี่ทุ่ม	si thum	สี่ทุ่ม	si thum	22:00	10:00 pm
5 in the evening	ห้าทุ่ม	ha thum	ห้าทุ่ม	ha thum	23:00	11:00 pm
midnight	หกทุ่ม, เที่ยงคืน, สองยาม	hok thum, thiang khuen, song yam	หกทุ่ม, เที่ยงคืน	hok thum, thiang khuen	00:00	12:00 am

^{*} The word chao (เช้า) is optional here since the numbers 7 to 11 are not used elsewhere
^{**} Conversationally, si mong yen (สี่โมงเย็น) and ha mong yen (ห้าโมงเย็น) are also spoken if considered as evening

== See also ==
- 12-hour clock
- 24-hour clock
- Date and time notation in Thailand
- The Italian six-hour clock, another six-hour system.
- Thai calendars, including the Thai solar calendar
- Thai numerals
- Time in Thailand
