= Time in Malaysia =

- Time zone

UTC offset
- MST: UTC+08:00

Current time
- :: MYT [refresh]

Observance of DST
- DST is not observed in this time zone.

Malaysian Standard Time (MST; Malay: Waktu Standard Malaysia, WSM or Malay: Waktu Piawai Malaysia, WPM), or sometimes Malaysian Time (MYT), is the standard time used in Malaysia. It is 8 hours ahead of Coordinated Universal Time (UTC). Malaysia does not observe daylight saving time.

== History ==
The local mean time in Kuala Lumpur was originally GMT+06:46:46. Peninsular Malaysia used the local mean time in Kuala Lumpur until 1 January 1901, when they changed to Singapore mean time GMT+06:55:25. Between the end of the Second World War and the formation of Malaysia on 16 September 1963, it was known as British Malayan Standard Time, which was GMT+07:30. At 23:30 hours local time of 31 December 1981, people in Peninsular Malaysia adjusted their clocks and watches ahead by 30 minutes to become 00:00 hours local time of 1 January 1982, to match the time used in East Malaysia, which is GMT+08:00. Singapore Standard Time followed suit and has continued to use the same time as Malaysia.

=== Time in Peninsular Malaysia ===
Period in use	Time offset from GMT	Name of Time (unofficial)
Prior to 1 January 1901	GMT+06:46:46	British Malayan Mean Time
1 January 1901 – 31 May 1905	GMT+06:55:25	Singapore Mean Time
1 June 1905 – 31 December 1932	GMT+07:00	Standard Zone Time
1 January 1933 – 31 August 1941	GMT+07:20	Malaya Daylight Time/Malaya Standard Time
1 September 1941 – 15 February 1942	GMT+07:30	Malaya Standard Time
16 February 1942 – 11 September 1945	GMT+09:00	Tokyo Standard Time
12 September 1945 – 31 December 1981	GMT+07:30	Malaya Standard Time/Malaysia Standard Time
1 January 1982 – present	GMT+08:00	Malaysian Standard Time

=== Time in East Malaysia ===
Period in use	Time offset from GMT	Name of Time (unofficial)
Prior to 1 March 1926	GMT+07:21:20	Kuching Mean Time
1 March 1926 – 31 December 1932	GMT+07:30	North Borneo Standard Time & Sarawak Standard Time
1 January 1933 - 15 February 1942	GMT+08:00	North Borneo & Sarawak Standard Time
16 February 1942 – 11 September 1945	GMT+09:00	Tokyo Standard Time
12 September 1945 – present	GMT+08:00	North Borneo/Sabah Standard Time and Sarawak Standard Time (until 1982); Malaysian Standard Time (currently)

- Prior to 1 January 1901 – locations in British Malaya with an astronomical observatory would adopt the local mean time based on the observatory's geographical position. Penang, Malacca and Singapore all had their own observatories; hence, the three Straits Settlements had their respective local mean time, with minutes of differences amongst the three locations.
- 1901 – On 1 January 1901, the Singapore Local Mean Time (Singapore Mean Time) was adopted by Straits Settlements and Federated Malay States as the Standard Time. This was introduced because railway, postal and telegraph services were becoming more common, and a single standard time will ease scheduling problems. Singapore was chosen because it was the administrative centre for the SS and the FMS then.
- 1905 – On 1 June 1905, the mean time of the 105th meridian was adopted by Straits Settlements and Federated Malay States as the new standard time. This decision was made way back in February 1904. The mean time of the 105th meridian is GMT+07:00 (the local mean time over Greenwich Royal Observatory near London). This standard time went into effect when the time ball on Fort Canning, Singapore was completed and became operational on the same day.
- 1920 – In 1920, a bill was introduced in the Straits Settlements Legislative Council to adopt daylight saving time just like the United Kingdom. The proposed time was 30 min forward of the mean time of the 105th meridian east, i.e. GMT+07:30. The reason for proposing this was to allow more leisure time for the labourers after work. This bill was dropped after the first reading.
- 1932 – 12 years after the 1920 introduction of the daylight saving time Bill, the same bill was reintroduced to the Legislative Council. One of the original reasons for dropping the 1920 bill was the argument that 30 minutes was too much change. Therefore, in 1932 the proposed shift was reduced by 10 minutes, down to 20 minutes ahead of the mean time of the 105th meridian. This was a compromise, which was perceived to be more acceptable to the overcautious Legislative Council members. After 2 debating sessions, this bill was passed and became Ordinance No. 21 of 1932. The short title was daylight saving time Ordinance, 1932. This was to come into force on the first day of January 1933 and was to be in force during the year 1933.
- 1933 – 1 January 1933, the daylight saving time Ordinance came into effect on New Year's Day. This ordinance as passed was in effect for the year 1933 only. Daylight saving time was 20 minutes faster than standard time, i.e. GMT+07:20.
- 1934–1935 – For the years 1934 and 1935, the daylight saving time Ordinance in 1932 was extended throughout both years by gazette notification.
- 1935 – In 1935, the daylight saving time Ordinance in 1932 was amended by Ordinance No. 5 of 1935—The daylight saving time (Amendment) Ordinance, 1935. The year limit 1933 was removed, turning the ordinance into permanent effect without the need for the Governor to declare any extensions. The time of GMT+07:20 became permanent standard time with this amendment. The Survey Department since 1935 by Annual Report advised readers to adjust their clocks appropriately by 20 minutes for the year 1936.
- 1936 – The daylight saving time Ordinance became Chapter 170 in the 1936 edition of the Laws of the Straits Settlements.
- 1941 – In 1941, the daylight saving time Ordinance was amended yet again by Ordinance 33 of 1941. Daylight saving time would henceforth be 30 min ahead of the mean time of the 105th meridian (10 min more than the original DST), i.e. GMT+07:30. This came into effect on 1 September 1941. This was the original daylight saving time proposed in 1920 and was met with much opposition then.
- 1942 – After the Japanese invasion of Malaya, on 16 February 1942, the Japanese formally occupied British Malaya. British Malayan Time moved ahead by 1 hour 30 minutes to conform with Tokyo Standard Time, which is GMT+09:00.
- 1945 – 12 September 1945, Japanese formally surrendered in Singapore. British Malayan Time reverted to "pre-invasion" standard: GMT+07:30. The exact dates for the change to and from Tokyo Standard Time have not been ascertained yet. The dates given here are based on educated speculation.

== Standardisation of time in Malaysia ==
Prime Minister of Malaysia Mahathir Mohamad declared that people in Peninsular Malaysia would adjust their clocks ahead by 30 minutes to match the time in use in East Malaysia (GMT+08:00) on 31 December 1981. The time was switched on 1 January 1982 from 00:00 (old time) to 00:30 (new time). This is enforced in law through the Malaysian Standard Time Act 1981. It is noted that the official law in use still reference to the Greenwich Mean Time (GMT) and is not updated to use Coordinated Universal Time (UTC).

== Timekeeper ==
On 1 January 1990, the Malaysian Cabinet appointed the National Metrology Laboratory (SIRIM) as the official timekeeper of Malaysia. The current timekeeping references to the Coordinated Universal Time (UTC) standard +00:00 area, offset forward by 8 hours (UTC+08:00). This timescale is derived from five atomic clocks maintained by SIRIM and is always within 0.9 seconds of the legal time.

== IANA time zone database ==
The IANA time zone database contains two zones for Malaysia in the file zone.tab:

c.c.*	coordinates*	TZ*	comments*	UTC offset	UTC offset DST	Notes
MY	+0310+10142	Asia/Kuala_Lumpur	Malaysia (peninsula)	+08:00	—N/a	
MY	+0133+11020	Asia/Kuching	Sabah, Sarawak	+08:00	—N/a	
