= UTC+07:00 =

Identifier for a time offset from UTC of +7

- Time zone
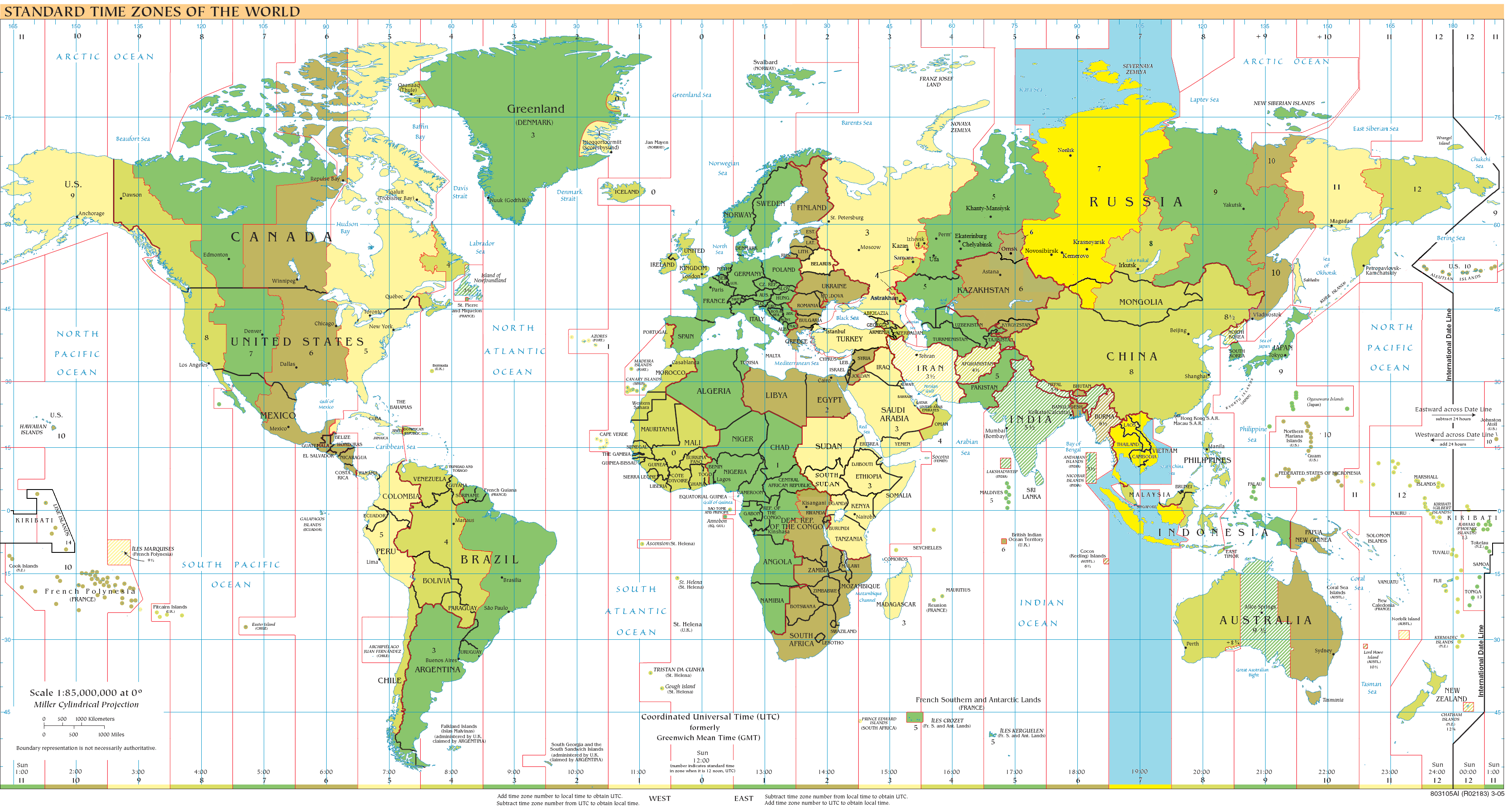
- World map with the time zone highlighted

UTC offset
- UTC: UTC+07:00

Current time
- 22:30, 16 August 2026 UTC+07:00 [refresh]

Central meridian
- 105 degrees E

Date-time group
- G

Time in Russia: KALT / Kaliningrad Time / UTC+2 / (MSK−1); MSK / Moscow Time / UTC+3 / (MSK±0); SAMT / Samara Time / UTC+4 / (MSK+1); YEKT / Yekaterinburg Time / UTC+5 / (MSK+2); OMST / Omsk Time / UTC+6 / (MSK+3); KRAT / Krasnoyarsk Time / UTC+7 / (MSK+4); IRKT / Irkutsk Time / UTC+8 / (MSK+5); YAKT / Yakutsk Time / UTC+9 / (MSK+6); VLAT / Vladivostok Time / UTC+10 / (MSK+7); MAGT / Magadan Time / UTC+11 / (MSK+8); PETT / Kamchatka Time / UTC+12 / (MSK+9)

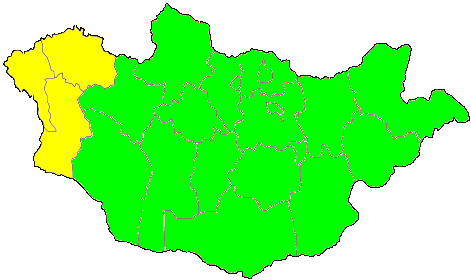
Time in Mongolia Western Mongolia Time (UTC+7) Eastern Mongolia Time (UTC+8)

Time in Indonesia
- Map of time zones of Indonesia
- Western Indonesia Time (WIB) UTC offset: UTC+07:00 (WIB+0)
- Central Indonesia Time (WITA) UTC offset: UTC+08:00 (WIB+1)
- Eastern Indonesia Time (WIT) UTC offset: UTC+09:00 (WIB+2)
- Adopted: 1 January 1988
- Time notation: 24-hour clock
- tz database: Asia/Jakarta · Asia/Pontianak · Asia/Makassar · Asia/Jayapura

UTC+07:00 is an identifier for a time offset from UTC of +07:00. In ISO 8601, the associated time would be written as 2026-08-16T22:30:49+07:00. It is seven hours ahead of UTC, meaning that when the time in UTC is midnight (00:00), the time in areas using the time zone would be 07:00.

Also known as Indochina Time (ICT), Western Indonesian Time (Indonesian: Waktu Indonesia Barat, WIB) in Indonesia, and Krasnoyarsk Time (Russian: Красноярское время) or MSK+4 (Russian: МСК+4) in Russia, it is used in the following regions:

== As standard time (year-round) ==
Principal cities: Krasnoyarsk, Novosibirsk, Khovd, Hanoi, Da Nang, Ho Chi Minh City, Phnom Penh, Vientiane, Bangkok, Medan, Palembang, Jakarta, Bandung, Semarang, Yogyakarta, Surabaya, Pontianak, Flying Fish Cove.

=== North Asia ===
- Russia – Krasnoyarsk Time
  - Siberian Federal District
    - Altai Krai
    - Altai Republic
    - Kemerovo Oblast
    - Khakassia
    - Krasnoyarsk Krai
    - Novosibirsk Oblast
    - Tomsk Oblast
    - Tuva

=== East Asia ===
It is considered the westernmost time zone in East Asia.

- Mongolia – Time in Mongolia
  - Western part, including Khovd, Uvs, Bayan-Ölgii, Govi-Altai and Zavkhan

=== Southeast Asia ===
- Cambodia – Time in Cambodia (Indochina Time)
- Laos – Time in Laos (Indochina Time)
- Thailand – Time in Thailand (Indochina Time)
- Vietnam – Time in Vietnam (Indochina Time)
- Indonesia – Western Indonesia Time
  - Western zone, including:
    - All provinces of Sumatra and surrounding islands:
      - Aceh
      - North Sumatra
      - West Sumatra
      - Riau
      - Riau Islands
      - Jambi
      - South Sumatra
      - Bangka Belitung Islands
      - Bengkulu
      - Lampung
    - All provinces of Java, and surrounding islands including:
      - Banten
      - Jakarta
      - West Java
      - Central Java
      - Special Region of Yogyakarta
      - East Java
    - Parts of Kalimantan:
      - West Kalimantan
      - Central Kalimantan

=== Oceania ===
==== Indian Ocean ====
- Australia – Christmas Island Time
  - Christmas Island

=== Antarctica ===
==== Southern Ocean ====
- Some bases in Antarctica. See also Time in Antarctica.
  - Australia
    - Davis Station

== Discrepancies between official UTC+07:00 and geographical UTC+07:00 ==
Since legal, political, and economic in addition to physical or geographical criteria are used in the drawing of time zones, it follows that official time zones do not precisely adhere to meridian lines. The UTC+07:00 time zone, were it drawn by purely geographical terms, would consist of exactly the area between meridians 97°30′ E and 112°30′ E. As a result, there are places which, despite lying in an area with a "physical" UTC+07:00 time, actually use another time zone. Conversely, there are areas that have adopted UTC+07:00, even though their "physical" time zone is UTC+08:00, UTC+06:00, or even UTC+05:00.

=== Areas within UTC+07:00 longitudes using other time zones ===
This concerns areas within 97°30′ E to 112°30′ E longitude.

Using UTC+06:30:

- Eastern part of Myanmar

Using UTC+08:00:

- In China, many parts of central China including these provinces:
  - Hainan
  - Guangxi
  - Yunnan
  - Guizhou
  - Sichuan
  - Chongqing
  - Shaanxi
  - Ningxia
  - Gansu
  - Western two-thirds of Hunan
  - Western half of:
    - Hubei
    - Shanxi
  - Inner Mongolia, including its capital Hohhot
  - Western third of:
    - Guangdong
    - Henan
- In Russia:
  - Irkutsk Oblast
  - Buryatia
- Outside China & Russia:
  - Most of central Mongolia including the capital Ulaanbaatar
  - Peninsular Malaysia
  - Western part of Sarawak in Malaysian Borneo including Kuching
  - Singapore

Using UTC+09:00:

- A (western) part Sakha Republic in Russia, including the urban localities Aykhal and Udachny

=== Areas outside UTC+07:00 longitudes using UTC+07:00 time ===
==== Areas between 67°30′ E and 97°30′ E ("physical" UTC+05:00 and UTC+06:00) ====
- The westernmost part of Indonesia including most of the province Aceh with its capital Banda Aceh.
- The westernmost part of Mongolia
- Parts of Russia:
  - A large part of Krasnoyarsk Krai
  - Tuva
  - Khakassia
  - Altai Republic
  - Altai Krai
  - Kemerovo Oblast
  - Novosibirsk Oblast (mostly within the "physical" UTC+05:00 area)
  - Tomsk Oblast (partly within the "physical" UTC+05:00 area)

==== Areas between 112°30′ E and 127°30′ E ("physical" UTC+08:00) ====
- In Indonesia:
  - The easternmost part of Java including East Java's capital Surabaya, Sidoarjo, Malang, and Banyuwangi.
  - The island of Bawean and Madura, and islands of Kangean and Masalembu, which administratively belong to East Java Province.
  - Eastern part of West Kalimantan, and most of Central Kalimantan, including the capital Palangka Raya
- In Russia:
  - The very easternmost part of Krasnoyarsk Krai

== Historical time offsets ==
Kansu-Szechwan (UTC+07:00) is marked green in this map.

The Republic of China's offset for this time zone was Kansu-Szechwan, and was used until 1949, when the Chinese Communist Party took control of Mainland China following the Chinese Civil War and made UTC+08:00 the standard time for all areas under its control. Formerly, from 1918 to 1949, this time offset was used in eastern Xikang and Qinghai, central Outer Mongolia (1921–1924), and all of Yunnan, Guangxi, Guizhou, Ningxia, Suiyuan, Gansu, Sichuan, and Shaanxi.

This time zone was also the standard time in Malaysia and Singapore between 1 June 1905 and 31 December 1932.

From 1964 to 1987, Bali used this time zone. The issuance of President Decree 41/1987 meant that the province's clocks sprang forward by one hour, thereby synchronising its mean time with other provinces in the Lesser Sunda Islands.

== See also ==
- Singapore Standard Time
- Time in China
- Time in Malaysia
- Time in Russia
