= 104th meridian east =

Line of longitude

104th meridian east

The meridian 104° east of Greenwich is a line of longitude that extends from the North Pole across the Arctic Ocean, Asia, the Indian Ocean, the Southern Ocean, and Antarctica to the South Pole.

The 104th meridian east forms a great circle with the 76th meridian west.

== From Pole to Pole ==
Starting at the North Pole and heading south to the South Pole, the 104th meridian east passes through:

Co-ordinates	Country, territory or sea	Notes
90°0′N 104°0′E	Arctic Ocean	
80°11′N 104°0′E	Laptev Sea	
79°7′N 104°0′E	Russia	Krasnoyarsk Krai — Bolshevik Island, Severnaya Zemlya
78°16′N 104°0′E	Laptev Sea	
77°42′N 104°0′E	Russia	Krasnoyarsk Krai; Irkutsk Oblast — from 58°45′N 104°0′E; Republic of Buryatia — from 51°13′N 104°0′E
50°10′N 104°0′E	Mongolia	
41°48′N 104°0′E	People's Republic of China	Inner Mongolia; Gansu — from 39°24′N 104°0′E; Inner Mongolia – from 38°49′N 104°0′E; Gansu — from 37°38′N 104°0′E, passing just east of Lanzhou (at 36°7′N 103°36′E); Sichuan — from 33°40′N 104°0′E, passing just west of Chengdu (at 30°40′N 104°4′E); Yunnan — from 28°36′N 104°0′E; Guizhou — from 27°25′N 104°0′E; Yunnan — from 26°33′N 104°0′E
22°31′N 104°0′E	Vietnam	
20°55′N 104°0′E	Laos	
19°24′N 104°0′E	Vietnam	
19°14′N 104°0′E	Laos	
18°18′N 104°0′E	Thailand	
14°21′N 104°0′E	Cambodia	
10°34′N 104°0′E	Gulf of Thailand	
10°27′N 104°0′E	Vietnam	Island of Phú Quốc
10°2′N 104°0′E	Gulf of Thailand	
7°56′N 104°0′E	South China Sea	Passing just west of Tioman Island, Malaysia (at 2°46′N 104°7′E); Passing just west of Tinggi Island, Malaysia (at 2°18′N 104°5′E)
2°10′N 104°0′E	Malaysia	
1°23′N 104°0′E	Singapore	Passing through Changi Airport
1°19′N 104°0′E	Singapore Strait	
1°8′N 104°0′E	Indonesia	Island of Batam
1°1′N 104°0′E	South China Sea	
1°0′S 104°0′E	Indonesia	Island of Sumatra
5°19′S 104°0′E	Indian Ocean	
60°0′S 104°0′E	Southern Ocean	
65°50′S 104°0′E	Antarctica	Australian Antarctic Territory, claimed by Australia

Next westward: 103rd meridian east	104th meridian east forms a great circle with 76th meridian west	Next eastward: 105th meridian east
