= Thai lunar calendar =

Religious calendar in Thailand

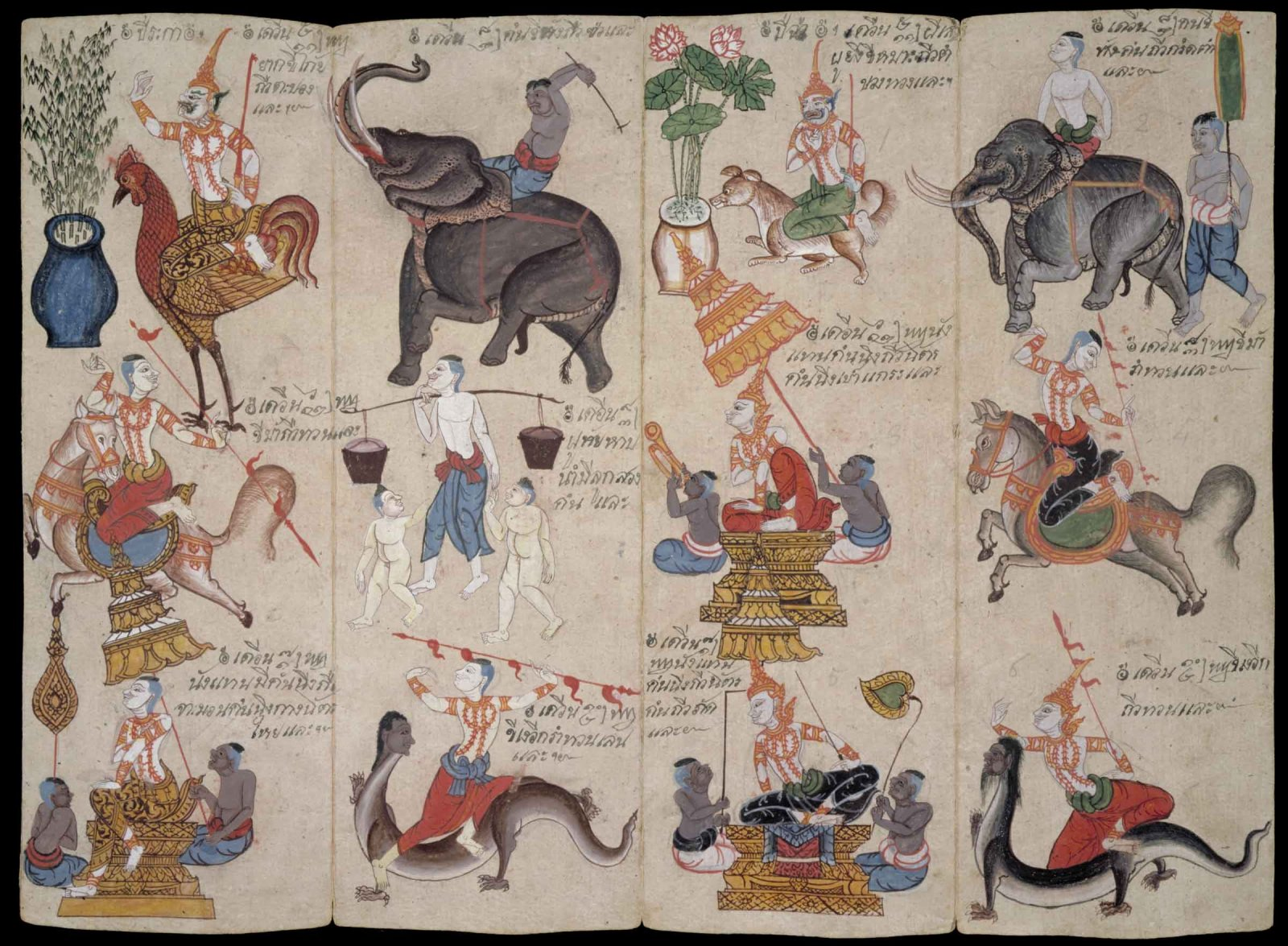
Fortune-Telling Manual (Phrommachat) with the twelve animals of the Thai zodiac and their associated attributes, avatars and plants. Thailand, c. 1845. Chester Beatty Library

The Thai lunar calendar (Thai: ปฏิทินจันทรคติ, RTGS: patithin chanthrakhati, pronounced [pà.tì.tʰīn t͡ɕān.tʰrá(ʔ).kʰā.tìʔ], literally, Specific days according to lunar norms), or Tai calendar, is a lunisolar Buddhist calendar. It is used for calculating lunar-regulated holy days. Based on the SuriyaYatra, with likely influence from the traditional Hindu Surya Siddhanta, it has its own unique structure that does not require the Surya Siddhanta to calculate. Lunisolar calendars combine lunar and solar calendars for a nominal year of 12 months. An extra day or an extra 30-day month is intercalated at irregular intervals.

== Legal versus religious calendar ==
The Thai solar calendar (Thai: ปฏิทินสุริยคติ, RTGS: patithin suriyakhati, [pà.tì.tʰin sù.rí.já.kʰàʔ.tìʔ]), Thailand's version of the Gregorian calendar, replaced the patithin chanthrakhati in AD 1888 / 2431 BE for legal and commercial purposes. In both calendars, the four principal lunar phases determine Buddhist Uposathas, obligatory holy days for observant Buddhists. Significant days also include feast days.

Note that the Thai and the Chinese lunar calendars do not directly correspond. Thai Chinese likewise observe their Uposatha and traditional Chinese holidays according to solar terms, two of which correspond to one lunar phase. These also move with respect to the solar calendar, and so it is common for Thai calendars to incorporate both Thai and Chinese lunar calendar-based events.

Mundane astrology also figures prominently in Thai culture, so modern Thai birth certificates include lunar calendar dates and the appropriate Thai Zodiacal animal year-name for Thai Hora (Thai: โหราศาสตร์, RTGS: horasat). The Thai Zodiac is similar to the Chinese, though the Dragon is replaced by the Naga (งูใหญ่), and in Northern Thailand the Pig is occasionally replaced with an Elephant.

Thai-Birth-Certificate-Solar-Lunar-Zodiac

== Years ==
To keep the years in sync with the seasons, Thai lunar years may add a day to the 7th month or repeat the 8th month. Therefore, years may have one of three lengths – 354, 355 or 384 days – yet retain a nominal length of twelve months.

- The 354-day-long years consist of 12 "normal months", and such a year is called a "normal-month year" (Thai: (ปี) ปกติมาส, RTGS: (pi) pakatimat, [(pī) pà.kà.ti.mâːt]).
- The 355-day-long years add an extra day to the normally 29-day-long 7th month; such a year is called an "extra-day year" (Thai: (ปี) อธิกวาร, RTGS: (pi) athikawan, Thai pronunciation: [(pīː) ʔà.tʰí.kà.waːn]).

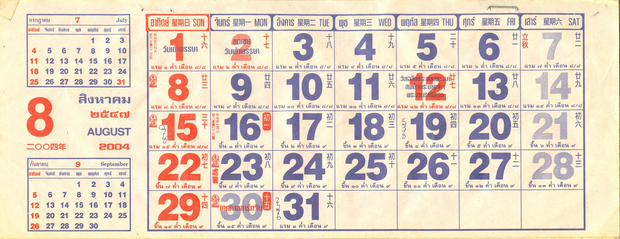
AD 2004/2547BE Extra lunar month ended August 15

- The 384-day-long years repeat the 30-day-long 8th month, thus keeping the month count at 12. Nevertheless, a year of 384 days is called an "extra-month year" (Thai: (ปี) อธิกมาส, RTGS: (pi) athikamat, [(pīː) ʔà.tʰí.kà.mâːt]).

=== New year ===
The Thai lunar calendar does not mark the beginning of a new year when it starts a new 1-to-12 count, which occurs most frequently in December.

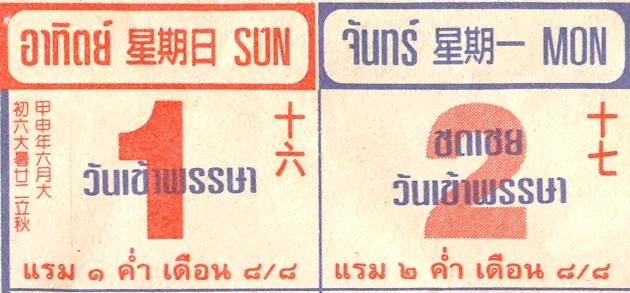
August 1 and 2, 2004. Sunday, a holiday, on the left, and Monday, observed as the compensatory day, on the right

The Thai solar calendar determines a person's legal age and the dates of secular holidays, including the civil new year and the three days of the traditional Thai New Year, which begin the next Twelve-year animal cycle. Should the holidays fall on a weekend, it also accommodates these as well as some of the principal lunar festivals with a compensatory day off (Thai: วันชดเชย, RTGS: wan chotchoei).

=== Twelve-year animal cycle ===
13 April of the solar calendar occasions the beginning of the traditional Thai New Year (Songkran) and is the day that a year assumes the name of the next animal in the twelve-year animal cycle; Thai Chinese communities may observe the name-change earlier in accordance with the Chinese New Year.

The Thai names of the months were borrowed from Khmer, which were in turn borrowed from Archaic Vietnamese.

Gregorian year	Thai zodiac	Animal	Khmer name	Vietnamese root
2025	Maseng (มะเส็ง)	蛇 Snake	Msáñ (ម្សាញ់)	Rắn
2026	Mamia (มะเมีย)	馬 Horse	Mâmi (មមី)	Mã?
2027	Mamae (มะแม)	羊 Goat	Mâmê (មមែ)	Mùi?
2028	Wok (วอก)	猴 Monkey	Vok (វក)	Vọc
2029	Raka (ระกา)	雞 Rooster	Râka (រកា)	Gà (Kê)
2030	Cho (จอ)	狗 Dog	Câ (ច)	Chó
2031	Kun (กุน)	豬 Pig	Kŏr (កុរ)	Cúi
2032	Chuat (ชวด)	鼠 Rat	Jut (ជូត)	Chuột
2033	Chalu (ฉลู)	牛 Ox	Chlov (ឆ្លូវ)	Trâu
2034	Khan (ขาล)	虎 Tiger	Khal (ខាល)	Cọp (Khái)
2035	Tho (เถาะ)	兔 Rabbit	Thaôh (ថោះ)	Thỏ
2036	Marong (มะโรง)	龍 Dragon	Roŭng (រោង)	Rồng

== Months ==
In the modern Thai calendar, months (Thai: เดือน, RTGS: duean, [dɯ̄ːan], meaning "month" or "Lunation") are defined by lunar cycles. Successive months (or lunations) are numbered from 1 to 12 within the Thai year. As in other Buddhist calendars, these months have names that derive from Sanskrit, but for the most part are only known by Thai astrologers.

Two successive lunations take slightly more than 59 days. The Thai lunar calendar approximates this interval with "normal-month" pairs (ปกติมาส, RTGS: pakatimat) that are alternately 29 and 30 days long. 29-day "hollow months" (เดือนขาด, RTGS: duean khat, [dɯ̄ːan kʰàːt]) are odd-numbered (เดือนคี่, RTGS: duean khi, [dɯːan.kʰî]); 30-day "full months" (เดือนถ้วน, RTGS: duean thuan, [dɯ̄ːan tʰûan]) are even-numbered (เดือนคู่, RTGS: duean khu, [dɯ̄ːan kʰûː]).

To keep the beginning of the month in sync with the new moon, from time to time either the normally "hollow" Month 7 takes an extra day, or an extra "full" Month 8 follows a normal "full" Month 8.

Months 1 and 2 are named in archaic alternate numbers, with the remainder being named in modern numbers.

=== Months 1 – 6 ===
Month 1, "duean ai" (เดือนอ้าย, [dɯ̄ːan ʔâːj]), begins the cycle of counting the months anew, most frequently in December, but does not signify the beginning of a new year. Ai, an archaic word in Thai but not in other dialects, means first. An odd-numbered hollow month, it is 29 days long.

Month 2, "duean yi", (เดือนยี่, [dɯ̄an jîː], from archaic ญี่ meaning 2) is an even-numbered full month.

Months 3–6, "duean 3–6", use the modern reading of Thai numerals, as do all remaining months. Months 3–6, alternate between 29-day hollow months and 30-day full months.

=== Month 7 and athikawan ===
Month 7, "duean 7", a hollow month is normally 29 days long in years of 354 days, but adds an extra day (อธิกวาร RTGS: athikawan) when required for 355-day-long years (ปีอธิกวาร, RTGS: pi athikawan).

=== Month 8 ===
The eighth month, "duean 8", is a 30-day full month.

=== Month 8/8 "athikamat" ===
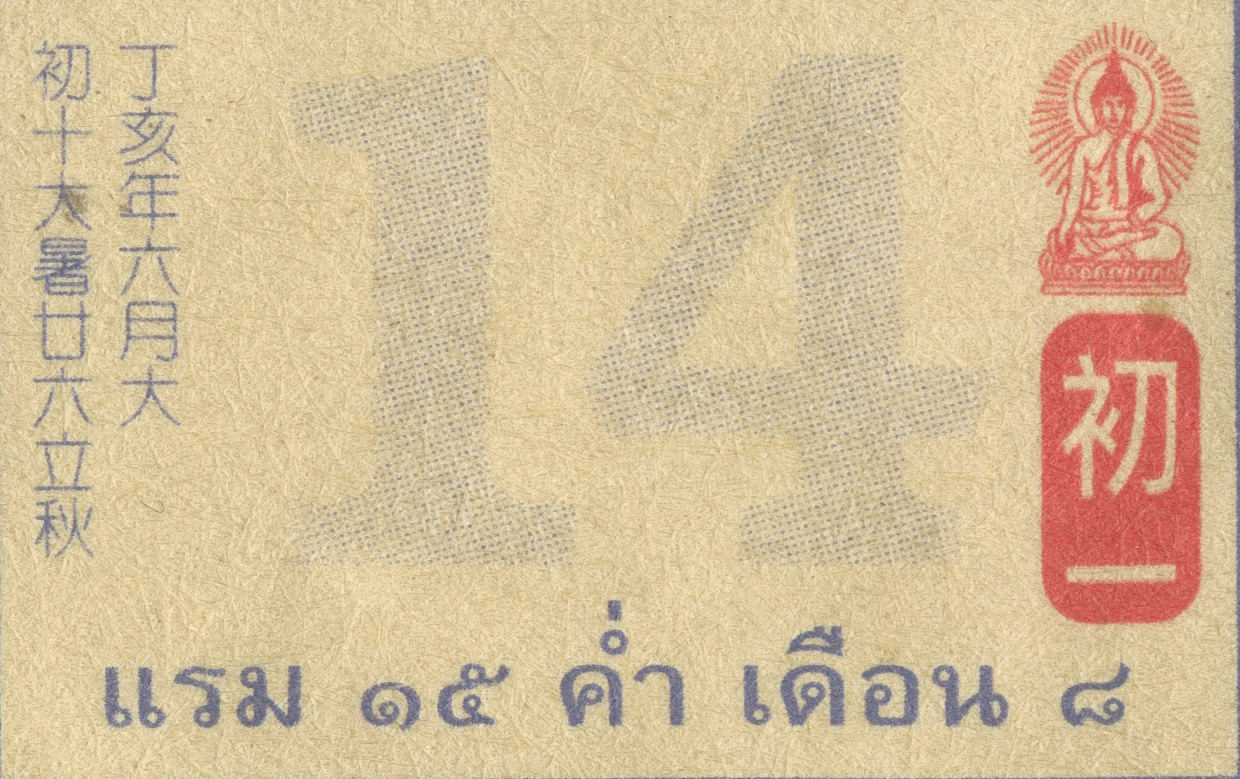

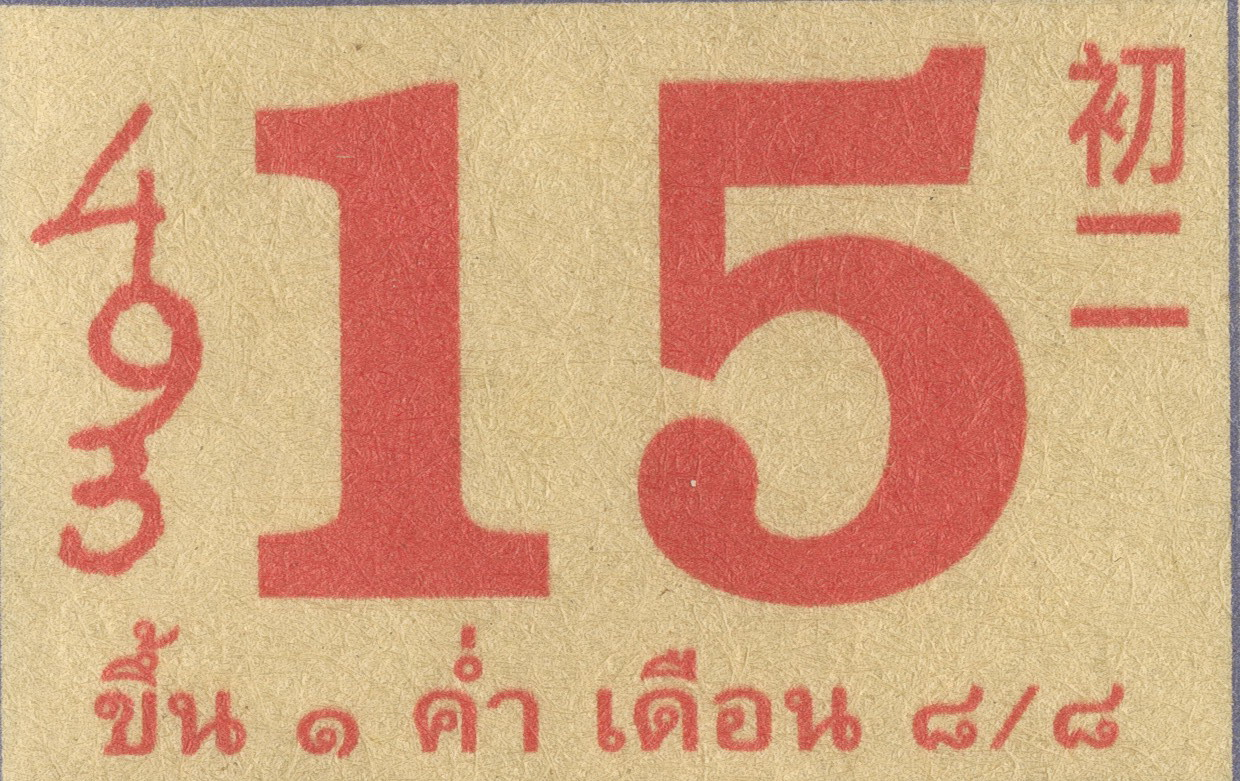

Athikamat (อธิกมาส, Thai pronunciation: [ʔà.tʰí.kà.mâːt])) is the extra month needed for a 384-day-long pi athikamat (extra-month year; ปีอธิกมาส, Thai pronunciation: [pī.ʔà.tʰí.kà.mâːt]). Month 8 repeats as เดือน ๘/๘ or Month 8/8, variously read as "duean paet thab paet" (เดือนแปดทับแปด) or "duean paet lang" (เดือนแปดหลัง)

=== Months 9 – 12 ===
Months 9–12, "duean 9–12", complete the lunar cycle.

=== Month divisions ===
Months divide into two periods designated by whether they are waxing or waning:

- Waxing : khang khuen (ข้างขึ้น), the period from new moon to full moon, is always 15 days long.
- Waning : khang raem (ข้างแรม), the period from full moon to new moon, which is 14 days long in hollow months, except when Month 7 adds an extra day, and 15 days long in full months.

== Weeks ==
A week is called Sapda/Sappada (Thai: สัปดาห์, [sàp.dāː, sàp.pà.dāː]). The term is defined by the Royal Institute Dictionary (RID) as a 7-day period beginning on Sunday and ending Saturday. When referring to lunations, however, it is the 7-, 8- or (rarely) 9-day interval between quartile lunar phases; that is, from one wan phra (วันพระ) to the next.

== Days ==
While solar-calendar weekdays have names, lunar-calendar days number sequentially from 1 to 14 or 15 in two segments depending on whether the moon is waxing or waning. For example, "raem 15 kham duean 12 แรม ๑๕ ค่ำ เดือน ๑๒" means "Waning of the 15th Night of the 12th Lunar Month".

Kham ค่ำ , evening, is considered to be the evening of the common day that begins and ends at midnight, rather than of a day that begins and ends at dusk. Past practice may have been different.

== Named lunar days ==
- Wan Phra วันพระ, Buddhist holy days
  - Wan Thamma Sawana วันธรรมสวนะ Buddhist Uposatha regularly fall on:
    - Khuen 8 ขึ้น ๘ first-quarter moon
    - Khuen 15 ขึ้น ๑๕ full moon; also called wan phen วันเพ็ญ day [of] full [moon]. However, Wan Deuan Phen วันเดือนเพ็ญ, the actual day of the full moon and khuen 15 kham do not always fall on the same day.
    - Raem 8 แรม ๘ third-quarter moon
    - Raem 14 (15) แรม ๑๔ (๑๕) the last day of the lunar month; also called wan dap วันดับ day [moon is] quenched, [or goes] out.
- Wan wai phra chan วันไหว้พระจันทร์, called "Day [of] Respect [for] the Holy Moon", is the actual day the Harvest moon becomes full. It occurs on khuen 14 (15) kham duean 10 ขึ้น ๑๔ (๑๕) ค่ำ เดือน ๑๐ (Waxing 14 (15) Evening, Month 10.)

== Holidays regulated by the moon ==
Uposatha, colloquially called วันพระ, are the New, First-quarter, Full, and Third-quarter Moon-days. These are not normally days off (วันหยุด), except for butcher, barber, and beautician shops that observe the Eight Precepts. Annual holidays and seasonal festivals collectively are called วันนักขัตฤกษ์.

Festivals or fairs are called เทศกาล; these may be further styled as ประเพณี "traditional" and as Thai: พิธี, "rite" or "ceremony". The table shows the principal ones governed by the moon in yellow.

Work holidays prescribed by the government are called Thai: วันหยุดราชการ; those regulated by the moon are red.

Weekends are normally days off; if a holiday normally observed by a day off falls on a weekend, the following Monday is a compensatory day off Thai: วันชดเชย.

Work holidays	and	festivals	regulated by the moon: x = waxing moon; n = waning

Mo.	Day	Event	ไทย	Comment
3†	1x	Chinese New Year	ตรุษจีน	Most shops owned by Chinese-Thai close
3	15x	Magha Puja	วันมาฆบูชา	Makha Bucha
6	15x	Vesak	วิสาขบูชา	Wisakha Bucha
8‡	15x	Asalha Puja	อาสาฬหบูชา	Asanha Bucha
8‡	1n	Wan Khao Phansa	วันเข้าพรรษา	Begin Rains Retreat, or "Buddhist Lent"
10	15n	Thetsakan Sat	เทศกาลสารท	The Vegetarian Festival (เทศกาลวันสารท) now appears on calendars as thetsakan kin che kao wan (เทศกาลกินเจเก้าวัน), (begin) Nine-day Vegetarian Festival. Kin Jae means (to vow) in the manner of Vietnamese or Chinese Buddhists to eat a strict vegetarian diet. (เทศกาลกินเจ)
11	15x	Wan Ok Phansa	วันออกพรรษา	End Rains Retreat, or "Buddhist Lent"
11	1n	Thot Kathin	ทอดกฐิน	Presentation of Monk's Robes after Rains Retreat
12	15x	Loi Krathong	ลอยกระทง	Note that Loi Krathong dates are based on the Lanna (Northern Thailand) Lunar Calendar which is two months later than the Thai Lunar Calendar. Loy Krathong is actually on the second month of the Lanna calendar which is the 12th month of the central Thai calendar.

Notes:

† The Chinese New Year uses different methods of determining intercalary months, so this festival sometimes occurs a month earlier or later.
‡ Month 8/8 in years with the extra month.

== Thai year vocabulary ==
Thai orthography spells most native words phonetically, though there is no definitive system for transcription into Roman letters. Here, native Thai words are immediately followed by a vocabulary entry in this pattern:

Phonetic Thai (Thai phonetic respelling, if different) [Comment] definition; variant definitions.

Example:

Thai ไทย (ไท) [Archaic] free, frank; Thai race, language, alphabet; citizen of Thailand.

Sanskrit loan words follow different rules [the way English grammatical rules vary for words of Greek and Latin origin ('ph-' in 'phonetic' being pronounced /f/, for example.)] Entered below in order of first appearance, these vocabulary entries are in this pattern:

Sanskrit สันสกฤต (สันสะกฺริด /san-sa-krit/)

Literally means "well done", "polished","cultured" or "perfected" in a modern usage (which implies the language of cultured persons); Sanskrit alphabet, language, writing; [presumed] compound of

- san สัน (-/son/) derived from the prefix "saṃ" meaning "together, with, completely"
- skrit สกฤต (สะกฺริต /sa-krit/) derived from the root "kr" meaning "do or make".

Chanthrakhati จันทรคติ (จันทฺระคะติ)
"Lunar norms", Lunar Calendar; compound of

- Chanthra- จันทร- (จันทฺระ) : Chan จันทร์ (จัน) moon, lunar +
- Kati คติ (คะติ) : ways, principles, norms

Patithin ปฏิทิน (ปะติทิน)
Calendar; compound of

- Pati- ปฏิ- (ปะติ-) : anti-, re-, for, specific +
- -thin (-ทิน) : [from Sanskrit dina] : day.
- patithin means for days, specific days or fixed days

Patitin Chanthakhati ปฏิทินจันทรคติ (ปะติทินจันทระคะติ)
"Specific days according to lunar norms", Lunar Calendar
Suriyakhati สุริยคติ (สุริยะคะติ)
Solar norms, Solar Calendar; compound of

- Suriya สุริย or สุริยะ : Athit อาทิตย์, the sun, Sol +
- Khati คติ (คะติ) : ways, principles, norms

Prokkatimat ปรกติมาส (ปฺรกกะติมาด)
normal month; compound of

- Prokkati ปรกติ (ปฺรกกะติ) : pakati ปกติ (ปะกะติ) ordinary, usual, normal +
- Mat มาส (มาด) : duean (เดือน) month.

Athikamat อธิกมาส (อะทิกะมาด)
month added in leap-month lunar years
Athikawan อธิกวาร (อะทิกะวาน)
day added in leap-day lunar years; compound of

- Athika (Sanskrit: adhika) : additional +
- -wan วาร (Sanskrit: vāra) : wan วัน day.

Athikasurathin อธิกสุรทิน (อะทิกะสุระทิน)
day added to February in a solar leap year.

== See also ==
- Public holidays in Thailand
- The Royal Institute of Thailand
- Thai solar calendar
- Thai 6-hour clock
- Time in Thailand
- Traditional Burmese calendar
