= 76th meridian west =

Line of longitude

76th meridian west

The meridian 76° west of Greenwich is a line of longitude that extends from the North Pole across the Arctic Ocean, North America, the Atlantic Ocean, the Caribbean Sea, South America, the Pacific Ocean, the Southern Ocean, and Antarctica to the South Pole.

The 76th meridian west forms a great circle with the 104th meridian east.

== From Pole to Pole ==
Starting at the North Pole and heading south to the South Pole, the 76th meridian west passes through:

Co-ordinates	Country, territory or sea	Notes
90°0′N 76°0′W	Arctic Ocean	
83°3′N 76°0′W	Canada	Nunavut — Ellesmere Island
77°59′N 76°0′W	Baffin Bay	Passing just east of Bylot Island, Nunavut, Canada (at 72°54′N 76°3′W)
72°34′N 76°0′W	Canada	Nunavut — Baffin Island
69°23′N 76°0′W	Foxe Basin	
69°1′N 76°0′W	Canada	Nunavut — Baird Peninsula, Baffin Island
68°47′N 76°0′W	Foxe Basin	
68°18′N 76°0′W	Canada	Nunavut — Prince Charles Island
67°15′N 76°0′W	Foxe Basin	
65°15′N 76°0′W	Canada	Nunavut — Foxe Peninsula, Baffin Island
64°22′N 76°0′W	Hudson Strait	
62°20′N 76°0′W	Canada	Quebec; Ontario — from 45°29′N 76°0′W, passing just west of Ottawa (at 45°25′N 75°42′W)
44°21′N 76°0′W	United States	New York; Pennsylvania — from 42°0′N 76°0′W; Maryland — from 39°42′N 76°0′W
38°17′N 76°0′W	Chesapeake Bay	
38°1′N 76°0′W	United States	Maryland — Smith Island
37°56′N 76°0′W	Chesapeake Bay	
37°51′N 76°0′W	United States	Virginia — Tangier Island
37°49′N 76°0′W	Chesapeake Bay	
37°21′N 76°0′W	United States	Virginia — tip of the Delmarva Peninsula
37°10′N 76°0′W	Chesapeake Bay	
36°55′N 76°0′W	United States	Virginia; North Carolina — from 36°33′N 76°0′W
36°10′N 76°0′W	Albemarle Sound	
35°43′N 76°0′W	United States	North Carolina — Engelhard
35°27′N 76°0′W	Pamlico Sound	
35°5′N 76°0′W	United States	North Carolina — Ocracoke Island
35°4′N 76°0′W	Atlantic Ocean	Passing just east of the island of Eleuthera, Bahamas (at 25°7′N 76°6′W); Passing just west of Little San Salvador Island, Bahamas at (24°35′N 75°57′W)
23°41′N 76°0′W	Bahamas	Great Exuma Island
23°36′N 76°0′W	Atlantic Ocean	Passing just west of the Jumentos Cays, Bahamas at (22°44′N 75°54′W)
21°6′N 76°0′W	Cuba	
19°58′N 76°0′W	Caribbean Sea	Passing just east of Jamaica at (17°54′N 76°11′W)
9°22′N 76°0′W	Colombia	
0°18′N 76°0′W	Ecuador	
2°4′S 76°0′W	Peru	
14°28′S 76°0′W	Pacific Ocean	
60°0′S 76°0′W	Southern Ocean	
69°38′S 76°0′W	Antarctica	Charcot Island, claimed by Chile (Antártica Chilena Province) and by the United Kingdom (British Antarctic Territory)
69°44′S 76°0′W	Southern Ocean	
72°47′S 76°0′W	Antarctica	Territory claimed by Chile (Antártica Chilena Province) and by the United Kingdom (British Antarctic Territory)

== See also ==
- 75th meridian west
- 77th meridian west
