= Thai numerals =

Notation for expressing numbers in Thai

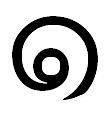
The notation for the number 1 in Thai language.

Thai numerals (Thai: เลขไทย, RTGS: lek thai, pronounced [lêːk tʰāj]) are a set of numerals traditionally used in Thailand, although the Arabic numerals are more common due to extensive westernization of Thailand in the modern Rattanakosin period. Thai numerals follow the Hindu–Arabic numeral system commonly used in the rest of the world. In the Thai language, numerals often follow the modified noun and precede a measure word, although variations to this pattern occur.

== Usage ==
The Thai language lacks grammatical number. A count is usually expressed in the form of an uninflected noun followed by a number and a classifier. "Five teachers" is expressed as "teacher five person" khru ha khon (Thai: ครูห้าคน or with the numeral included Thai: ครู ๕ คน.) Khon "person" is a type of referent noun that is also used as the Thai part of speech called in English a linguistic classifier, or measure word. In Thai, counting is kannap (การนับ; nap is "to count", kan is a prefix that forms a noun from a verb); the classifier, laksananam (ลักษณนาม from laksana characteristic, form, attribute, quality, pattern, style; and nam name, designation, appellation.) Variations to this pattern do occur, and there really is no hierarchy among Thai classifiers. A partial list of Thai words that also classify nouns can be found in Wiktionary category: Thai classifiers

== Main numbers ==
=== Zero to ten ===
Thai sūn (zero) is written as oval 0 (number) when using Arabic numerals, but a small circle ๐ when using traditional numerals, and also means centre in other contexts. It is from Sanskrit śūnya, as are the (context-driven) alternate names for numbers one to four given below; but not the counting 1 (number).

Thai names for N +1 and the regular digits 2 through 9 as shown in the table below, resemble those in Chinese varieties (e.g., Cantonese and Min Nan) as spoken in Southern China, the homeland of the overseas Chinese living in South East Asia. In fact, the etymology of Thai numerals 2, 3, 4, 6, 7, 8, 9, and 10 is traceable to Middle Chinese, while the etymology of Thai numeral 5 comes further back from Old Chinese, as illustrated in the table below.

Number	Thai					Etymology	Southern Sinitic languages						
Number	Numeral	Written	RTGS	IPA	Archaic	Etymology	Southern Min (Min Nan)				Hakka	Yue	
Number	Numeral	Written	RTGS	IPA	Archaic	Etymology	Hokkien		TeoSwa (Teochew / Swatow)		Hakka	Cantonese	Taishanese
Number	Numeral	Written	RTGS	IPA	Archaic	Etymology	Vernacular	Literary	Vernacular	Literary	Hakka	Cantonese	Taishanese
0	๐	ศูนย์	sun	/sǔːn/		Sanskrit śūnya	空 (khòng, IPA: /kʰɔŋ²¹^{/}⁴¹/)	零 (lêng, IPA: /liɪŋ²⁴^{/}¹³/)	空 (khàng, IPA: /kʰaŋ²¹³/)	零 (lêng, IPA: /leŋ⁵⁵/)	零 (làng, IPA: /laŋ¹¹/)	零 (ling^{4}, IPA: /lɪŋ²¹/)	零 (len^{3}, IPA: /len²²/)
1	๑	หนึ่ง	nueng	/nɯ̀ŋ/	อ้าย (ai)	Proto-Tai */nʉŋ/	蜀 (chi̍t, IPA: /t͡sit̚⁴^{/}²⁴^{/}¹²¹/)	一 (it, IPA: /it̚³²^{/}⁵/)	蜀 (tse̍k / tse̍h, IPA: /t͡sek̚⁴/, /t͡seʔ⁴/)	一 (ik / ek, IPA: /ik̚²/, /ek̚²/)	一 (yit, IPA: /(j)it̚²/)	一 (yāt / jat^{1}, IPA: /jɐt̚⁵/)	一 (yit^{2}, IPA: /jit̚⁵⁵/)
2	๒	สอง	song	/sɔ̌ːŋ/	ยี่ (yi)	Middle Chinese /ʃˠʌŋ/ and /ȵiɪ^{H}/	兩 (nn̄g/nňg/nō͘, IPA: /nŋ̍²²/, /nŋ̍²²/, /nɔ̃²²/), 雙 (siang/sang, IPA: /siaŋ⁴⁴/, /saŋ³³/, lit. "pair")	二 (lī / jī, IPA: /li²²^{/}⁴¹/, /d͡zi²²/), 雙 (song, IPA: /sɔŋ⁴⁴^{/}³³/, lit. "pair")	二/兩 (nŏ, IPA: /no³⁵/), 雙 (sang, IPA: /saŋ³³/, lit. "pair")	二 (jĭ / jī, IPA: /d͡zi³⁵/, /d͡zi¹¹/), 雙 (sang, IPA: /saŋ³³/, lit. "pair")	二 (ngi, IPA: /ŋi⁵⁵/, /ŋi⁵³/), 雙 (sûng, IPA: /suŋ²⁴/, /sʊŋ⁴⁴/, lit. "pair")	二 (yih / ji^{6}, IPA: /jiː²²/, 雙 (soeng^{1}, sung^{1}, lit. "pair" IPA: /sœːŋ⁵⁵/, /sʊŋ⁵⁵/)	二 (ngei^{5}, IPA: /ᵑɡei³²/, 雙 (song^{1}, lit. "pair" IPA: /sɔŋ³³/)
3	๓	สาม	sam	/sǎːm/	สาม (sam)	Middle Chinese /sɑm/	三 (saⁿ, IPA: /sã⁴⁴^{/}³³/)	三 (sam, IPA: /sam⁴⁴^{/}³³/)	三 (saⁿ, IPA: /sã³³/)	三 (sam, IPA: /sam³³/)	三 (sâm, IPA: /sam²⁴^{/}⁴⁴/)	三 (saam^{1}, IPA: /saːm⁵⁵/)	三 (lham^{1}, IPA: /ɬam³³/)
4	๔	สี่	si	/sìː/	ไส (sai)	Middle Chinese /siɪ^{H}/	四 (sì, IPA: /si²¹^{/}⁴¹/)	四 (sù / sìr / sì, IPA: /su²¹/, /sɯ⁴¹/, /si⁴¹/)	四 (sì, IPA: /si²¹³/)	四 (sì, IPA: /si²¹³/)	四 (si, IPA: /si⁵⁵^{/}⁵³/)	四 (sei^{3}, si^{3}, IPA: /sei̯³³/, /siː³³/)	四 (lhei^{1}, lhu^{1}, IPA: /ɬei³³/, /ɬu³³/)
5	๕	ห้า	ha	/hâː/	งั่ว (ngua)	Old Chinese /*ŋaːʔ/ / Middle Chinese /ŋuoX/	五 (gō͘ / gǒ͘, IPA: /ɡɔ²²/)	五 (ngó͘ / gó͘, IPA: /ŋɔ̃⁵³/, /ɡɔ⁵⁵⁴/)	五 (ngŏu, IPA: /ŋou³⁵/)	五 (ngóu / ú, IPA: /ŋou⁵²/, /u⁵²/)	五 (ńg, IPA: /ŋ̍³¹/, /n̩³¹/)	五 (ng^{5}, IPA: /ŋ̍¹³/)	五 (m^{2}, IPA: /m̩⁵⁵/)
6	๖	หก	hok	/hòk/	ลก (lok)	Middle Chinese /lɨuk̚/	六 (la̍k, IPA: /lak̚⁴^{/}²⁴^{/}¹²¹/)	六 (lio̍k, IPA: /liɔk̚⁴^{/}²⁴^{/}¹²¹/)	六 (la̍k, IPA: /lak̚⁴/)	六 (la̍k, IPA: /lak̚⁴/)	六 (liuk, IPA: /li̯uk̚²/, /liʊk̚¹/)	六 (luk^{6}, IPA: /lʊk̚²/)	六 (luuk^{5}, IPA: /lɵk̚³²/)
7	๗	เจ็ด	chet	/tɕèt/	เจ็ด (chet)	Middle Chinese /t͡sʰiɪt̚/	七 (chhit, IPA: /t͡sʰit̚³²^{/}⁵/)	七 (chhit, IPA: /t͡sʰit̚³²^{/}⁵/)	七 (tshik / tshek, IPA: /t͡sʰik̚²/, /t͡sʰek̚²/)	七 (tshik / tshek, IPA: /t͡sʰik̚²/, /t͡sʰek̚²/)	七 (chhit, IPA: /t͡sʰit̚²^{/}¹/)	七 (cat^{1}, IPA: /t͡sʰɐt̚⁵/)	七 (tit^{2}, IPA: /tʰit̚⁵⁵/)
8	๘	แปด	paet	/pɛ̀ːt/	แปด (paet)	Middle Chinese /pˠɛt̚/	八 (poeh / peh, IPA: /pueʔ³²^{/}⁵/, /peʔ³²/)	八 (pat, IPA: /pat̚³²^{/}⁵/)	八 (poih, IPA: /poiʔ²/)	八 (poih, IPA: /poiʔ²/)	八 (pat, IPA: /pat̚²^{/}¹/)	八 (baat^{3}, IPA: /paːt̚³/)	八 (bat^{1}, IPA: /pat̚³³/)
9	๙	เก้า	kao	/kâːw/	เจา (chao)	Middle Chinese /kɨuX/	九 (káu, IPA: /kau⁵³^{/}⁵⁵⁴/)	九 (kiú, IPA: /kiu⁵³^{/}⁵⁵⁴/)	九 (káu, IPA: /kau⁵²/)	九 (kiú, IPA: /kiu⁵²/)	九 (kiú, IPA: /ki̯u³¹/)	九 (gau^{2}, IPA: /kɐu̯³⁵/)	九 (giu^{2}, IPA: /kiu⁵⁵/)
10	๑๐	สิบ	sip	/sìp/	จ๋ง (chong)	Middle Chinese /d͡ʑiɪp̚/	十 (cha̍p, IPA: /t͡sap̚⁴^{/}²⁴^{/}¹²¹/)	十 (si̍p, IPA: /sip̚⁴^{/}²⁴^{/}¹²¹/)	十 (tsa̍p / tsa̍k, IPA: /t͡sap̚⁴/, /t͡sak̚⁴/)	十 (tsa̍p / tsa̍k, IPA: /t͡sap̚⁴/, /t͡sak̚⁴/)	十 (sṳ̍p, IPA: /sɨp̚⁵/, /səp̚⁵/)	十 (sap^{6}, IPA: /sɐp̚²/)	十 (sip^{5}, IPA: /sip̚³²/)

Thai, Lao and Khmer numbers are also quite similar, but the numerals vary somewhat in shape and pronunciation. Shown above is a comparison between three languages using Cantonese and Minnan characters and pronunciations. Shown below is a comparison between three languages using Khmer numerals: Thai, Khmer, and Lao. The Thai transliteration uses the Royal Thai General System of Transcription (RTGS).

Number	Thai					Khmer			Lao		
Number	Numeral	Written	RTGS	IPA	Archaic	Numeral	Written	IPA	Numeral	Written	IPA
0	๐	ศูนย์	sun	/sǔːn/	(Sanskrit śūnya)	០	សូន្យ	/soːn/	໐	ສູນ	/sǔːn/
1	๑	หนึ่ง	nueng	/nɯ̀ŋ/	อ้าย (ai)	១	មួយ	/muəj/	໑	ນຶ່ງ	/nɯ̄ŋ/
2	๒	สอง	song	/sɔ̌ːŋ/	ยี่ (yi)	២	ពីរ	/piː/	໒	ສອງ	/sǒːŋ/
3	๓	สาม	sam	/sǎːm/	สาม (sam)	៣	បី	/ɓej/	໓	ສາມ	/sǎːm/
4	๔	สี่	si	/sìː/	ไส (sai)	៤	បួន	/ɓuən/	໔	ສີ່	/sīː/
5	๕	ห้า	ha	/hâː/	งั่ว (ngua)	៥	ប្រាំ	/pram/	໕	ຫ້າ	/hȁː/
6	๖	หก	hok	hòk	ลก (lok)	៦	ប្រាំមួយ	/pram muəj/	໖	ຫົກ	/hók/
7	๗	เจ็ด	chet	/tɕèt/	เจ็ด (chet)	៧	ប្រាំពីរ	/pram piː/	໗	ເຈັດ	/tɕét/
8	๘	แปด	paet	/pɛ̀ːt/	แปด (paet)	៨	ប្រាំបី	/pram ɓəj/	໘	ແປດ	/pɛ̏ːt/
9	๙	เก้า	kao	/kâːw/	เจา (chao)	៩	ប្រាំបួន	/pram ɓuən/	໙	ເກົ້າ	/kâw/
10	๑๐	สิบ	sip	/sìp/	จ๋ง (chong)	១០	ដប់	/ɗɑp/	໑໐	ສິບ	/síp/

=== Ten to a million ===
Sanskrit lakh designates the place value of a digit (tamnaeng khong tua lek, ตําแหน่งของตัวเลข), which are named for the powers of ten: the unit's place is lak nuai (หลักหน่วย); ten's place, lak sip (หลักสิบ); hundred's place, lak roi (หลักร้อย), and so forth. The number one following any multiple of sip becomes et (Cantonese: 一, yat^{1}; Minnan: 一, it^{4}). The number ten (sip) is the same as Literary Hokkien 十 (si̍p). Numbers from twenty to twenty nine begin with yi sip (Cantonese: 二十 (yi^{6}sap^{6}); Hokkien: 二十 (lī-cha̍p / jī-cha̍p / gī-cha̍p); Teochew: 二十 (jĭ tsa̍p)). Names of the lak sip for 30 to 90, and for the lak of 100, 1000, 10,000, 100,000 and million, are almost identical to those of the Khmer numerals, as historically speaking, Thai or Tai-Kadai numerals were borrowed into the language, replacing native Khmer terms.

Number	Thai		RTGS	IPA	Notes
10	๑๐	สิบ	sip	/sìp/	
11	๑๑	สิบเอ็ด	sip et	/sìp ʔèt/	nueng for just 1, et for 1 as the ending digit in other cases The usage of nueng in place of et for all cases was mandated in the Royal Thai Navy, for example "สิบหนึ่ง" (sip nueng).
12	๑๒	สิบสอง	sip song	/sìp sɔ̌ːŋ/	
20	๒๐	ยี่สิบ	yi sip	/jîː sìp/	yi for 2 as the tens digit, song in other cases
21	๒๑	ยี่สิบเอ็ด	yi sip et	/jîː sìp ʔèt/	
22	๒๒	ยี่สิบสอง	yi sip song	/jîː sìp sɔ̌ːŋ/	
30	๓๐	สามสิบ	sam sip	/sǎːm sìp/	
31	๓๑	สามสิบเอ็ด	sam sip et	/sǎːm sìp ʔèt/	
32	๓๒	สามสิบสอง	sam sip song	/sǎːm sìp sɔ̌ːŋ/	
100	๑๐๐	ร้อย	roi	/rɔ́ːj/	
1000	๑๐๐๐	พัน	phan	/pʰān/	
10 000	๑๐๐๐๐	หมื่น	muen	/mɯ̀ːn/	From Middle Chinese 萬 /mʉɐnH/. Compare Hokkien 萬 (bān), TeoSwa 萬 (buēng / buāng), Cantonese 萬 (maan^{6}), Hakka 萬 (van), Japanese 万 (まん, man), Korean 만 (萬, man), Vietnamese vạn / muôn / man (萬／𨷈)
100 000	๑๐๐๐๐๐	แสน	saen	/sɛ̌ːn/	Compare Burmese သိန်း (thein, spelt sin)
1 000 000	๑๐๐๐๐๐๐	ล้าน	lan	/láːn/	

For the numbers twenty-one through twenty-nine, the part signifying twenty: yi sip (ยี่สิบ), may be colloquially shortened to yip (ยีบ). See the alternate numbers section below.

The hundreds are formed by combining roi with the tens and ones values. For example, two hundred and thirty-two is song roi sam sip song. The words roi, phan, muen, and saen should occur with a preceding numeral (nueng is optional), so two hundred ten, for example, is song roi sip, and one hundred is either roi or nueng roi. Nueng never precedes sip, so song roi nueng sip is incorrect. Native speakers will sometimes use roi nueng (or phan nueng, etc.) with different tones on nueng to distinguish one hundred from one hundred and one. However, such distinction is often not made, and ambiguity may follow. To resolve this problem, if the number 101 (or 1001, 10001, etc.) is intended, one should say roi et (or phan et, muen et, etc.).

=== Numbers above a million ===
Numbers above a million are constructed by prefixing lan with a multiplier. For example, ten million is sip lan, and a trillion (10^{12}, a long scale billion) is lan lan.

=== Decimal and fractional numbers ===
Colloquially, decimal numbers are formed by saying chut (จุด, dot) where the decimal separator is located. For example, 1.01 is nueng chut sun nueng (หนึ่งจุดศูนย์หนึ่ง).

Fractional numbers are formed by placing nai (ใน, in, of) between the numerator and denominator or using [set] x suan y ([เศษ] x ส่วน y, x parts of the whole y) to clearly indicate. For example, 1/3 is nueng nai sam (หนึ่งในสาม) or [set] nueng suan sam ([เศษ]หนึ่งส่วนสาม). The word set (เศษ) can be omitted.

The word khrueng (ครึ่ง) is used for "half". It precedes the measure word if used alone, but it follows the measure word when used with another number. For example, kradat khrueng phaen (กระดาษครึ่งแผ่น) means "half sheet of paper", but kradat nueng phaen khrueng (กระดาษหนึ่งแผ่นครึ่ง) means "one and a half sheets of paper".

=== Negative numbers ===
Negative numbers are formed by placing lop (ลบ, minus) in front of the number. For example, −11 is lop sip et (ลบสิบเอ็ด).

=== Ordinal numbers ===
Ordinal numbers are formed by placing thi (ที่, place) in front of the number. They are not considered a special class of numbers, since the numeral still follows a modified noun, which is thi in this case.

Thai	RTGS	IPA	meaning
ที่หนึ่ง	thi nueng	/tʰîː nɯ̀ŋ/	first
ที่สอง	thi song	/tʰîː sɔ̌ːŋ/	second
ที่สาม	thi sam	/tʰîː sǎːm/	third
ที่สี่	thi si	/tʰîː sìː/	fourth
ที่#	thi #	/tʰîː/	#st, #nd, #rd, #th

== Alternative numbers ==
=== Ai ===
Ai (Thai: อ้าย) is used for "first born (son)" or for the first month, duean ai (เดือนอ้าย), of the Thai lunar calendar.

=== Ek ===
Ek (Thai: เอก) is from Pali ḗka, "one" Ek is used for one (quantity); first (rank), more prominent than tho โท second, in tone marks, education degrees and military ranks; and for the lead actor in a role. In antiquity, a seventh daughter was called luk ek (ลูกเอก), though a seventh son was luk chet (ลูกเจ็ด).

=== Et ===
Et (Thai: เอ็ด, Cantonese: 一, jat^{1}; Minnan: 一, it^{4}), meaning "one", is used as last member in a compound number (see the main numbers section above).

=== Tho ===
Tho (Thai: โท) is from Pali dūā, "two". Tho is used for two and for the second-level rank in tone marks, education degrees and military ranks.

=== Yi ===
Yi (Thai: ยี่, Cantonese: 二, ji^{6}; Minnan: 二, ji^{7}) is still used in several places in Thai language for the number two, apart from song (สอง): to construct twenty (two tens) and its combinations twenty-one through twenty-nine; to name the second month, duean yi (เดือนยี่), of the traditional Thai lunar calendar; and in the Thai northern dialect thin pha yap (ถิ่นพายัพ), in which it refers to the Year of the Tiger.

=== Tri & Trai ===
Tri (ตรี) and trai (ไตร) are from Sanskrit trāyaḥ, "three". These alternatives are used for three; third rank in tone marks, education degrees and military ranks; and as a prefix meaning three(fold).

=== Chattawa ===
Chattawa (จัตวา) is the Pali numeral four; used for the fourth tone mark and as a prefix meaning fourth in order or quadruple in number.

=== Lo ===
Lo (Thai: โหล) means a dozen or twelve. It is usually used for trade. It may also mean jar or bottle.

=== Yip ===
Yip (Thai: ยีบ or ยิบ) in colloquial Thai is an elision or contraction of yi sip (ยี่สิบ) at the beginning of numbers twenty-one through twenty-nine. Therefore, one may hear yip et (ยีบเอ็ด, ยิบเอ็ด), yip song (ยีบสอง, ยิบสอง), up to yip kao (ยีบเก้า, ยิบเก้า). Yip may have a long vowel (ยีบ) or be elided further into a short vowel (ยิบ).

=== Sao ===
Sao (Thai: ซาว) is twenty in the Thai northern dialect and in the Isan language. It is related to xao (ຊາວ), the word for twenty in the Lao language.

=== Kurut ===
Kurut (Thai: กุรุส) means a dozen dozen or 144. It is usually used for trade. It is a loanword from gross.

=== Kot ===
Kot (Thai: โกฏิ) is ten million used in religious context. It comes from Pali/Sanskrit kōṭi. See also crore.

== Tone marks, education degrees and military ranks ==
The alternate set of numerals used to name tonal marks (ไม้, mai), educational degrees (ปริญญา, parinya), and military rankings derive from names of Sanskrit numerals.

Number			Tonal Mark				Educational Degree			Military Ranking in the Royal Thai Army		
Thai	RTGS	Value	Mark	Thai	RTGS	Tone	Thai	RTGS	Degree	Thai	RTGS	Meaning
เอก	ek	first	-่	ไม้เอก	mai ek	first tone	ปริญญาเอก	parinya ek	doctor's	พลเอก	phon ek	General
เอก	ek	first	-่	ไม้เอก	mai ek	first tone	ปริญญาเอก	parinya ek	doctor's	พันเอก	phan ek	Colonel
เอก	ek	first	-่	ไม้เอก	mai ek	first tone	ปริญญาเอก	parinya ek	doctor's	ร้อยเอก	roi ek	Captain
เอก	ek	first	-่	ไม้เอก	mai ek	first tone	ปริญญาเอก	parinya ek	doctor's	จ่าสิบเอก	cha sip ek	Master Sgt. 1st Class
เอก	ek	first	-่	ไม้เอก	mai ek	first tone	ปริญญาเอก	parinya ek	doctor's	สิบเอก	sip ek	Sergeant (Sgt.)
โท	tho	second	-้	ไม้โท	mai tho	second tone	ปริญญาโท	parinya tho	master's	พลโท	phon tho	Lieutenant General
โท	tho	second	-้	ไม้โท	mai tho	second tone	ปริญญาโท	parinya tho	master's	พันโท	phan tho	Lieutenant Colonel
โท	tho	second	-้	ไม้โท	mai tho	second tone	ปริญญาโท	parinya tho	master's	ร้อยโท	roi tho	Lieutenant
โท	tho	second	-้	ไม้โท	mai tho	second tone	ปริญญาโท	parinya tho	master's	จ่าสิบโท	cha sip tho	Master Sgt. 2nd Class
โท	tho	second	-้	ไม้โท	mai tho	second tone	ปริญญาโท	parinya tho	master's	สิบโท	sip tho	Corporal
ตรี	tri	third	-๊	ไม้ตรี	mai tri	third tone	ปริญญาตรี	parinya tri	bachelor's	พลตรี	phon tri	Major general
ตรี	tri	third	-๊	ไม้ตรี	mai tri	third tone	ปริญญาตรี	parinya tri	bachelor's	พันตรี	phan tri	Major
ตรี	tri	third	-๊	ไม้ตรี	mai tri	third tone	ปริญญาตรี	parinya tri	bachelor's	ร้อยตรี	roi tri	Sub Lieutenant
ตรี	tri	third	-๊	ไม้ตรี	mai tri	third tone	ปริญญาตรี	parinya tri	bachelor's	จ่าสิบตรี	cha sip tri	Master Sgt. 3rd Class
ตรี	tri	third	-๊	ไม้ตรี	mai tri	third tone	ปริญญาตรี	parinya tri	bachelor's	สิบตรี	sip tri	Lance Corporal
จัตวา	chattawa	fourth	-๋	ไม้จัตวา	mai chattawa	fourth tone				พลจัตวา	phon chattawa	Brigadier General (Honorary)

== See also ==
- Chinese numerals
- Indian numbering system
- Indian numerals
- Khmer numerals
- Lakh
- Thai alphabet
- Thai language
- Thai six-hour clock
- The Royal Institute of Thailand
