= 105th meridian east =

Line of longitude

105th meridian east

The meridian 105° east of Greenwich is a line of longitude that extends from the North Pole across the Arctic Ocean, Asia, the Indian Ocean, the Southern Ocean, and Antarctica to the South Pole. Under mean solar time represents the offset of UTC+07:00 time zone.

The 105th meridian east forms a great circle with the 75th meridian west.

== From Pole to Pole ==
Starting at the North Pole and heading south to the South Pole, the 105th meridian east passes through:

| Co-ordinates | Country, territory or sea | Notes |
|---|---|---|
| 90°0′N 105°0′E | Arctic Ocean | |
| 80°4′N 105°0′E | Laptev Sea | |
| 78°50′N 105°0′E | Russia | Krasnoyarsk Krai — Bolshevik Island, Severnaya Zemlya |
| 78°21′N 105°0′E | Laptev Sea | |
| 77°35′N 105°0′E | Russia | Krasnoyarsk Krai; Irkutsk Oblast — from 61°25′N 105°0′E; Krasnoyarsk Krai — from 61°14′N 105°0′E; Irkutsk Oblast — from 61°11′N 105°0′E; Krasnoyarsk Krai — from 60°11′N 105°0′E; Irkutsk Oblast — from 59°46′N 105°0′E; Krasnoyarsk Krai — from 59°28′N 105°0′E; Irkutsk Oblast — from 58°59′N 105°0′E; Republic of Buryatia — from 51°42′N 105°0′E (border is in Lake Baikal) |
| 50°24′N 105°0′E | Mongolia | |
| 41°36′N 105°0′E | People's Republic of China | Inner Mongolia; Ningxia – from 37°32′N 105°0′E; Gansu – from 37°2′N 105°0′E; Sichuan – from 32°37′N 105°0′E; Yunnan – from 28°1′N 105°0′E; Guizhou – from 27°22′N 105°0′E; Guangxi – from 24°47′N 105°0′E; Yunnan – from 24°26′N 105°0′E |
| 23°13′N 105°0′E | Vietnam | |
| 18°45′N 105°0′E | Laos | |
| 16°16′N 105°0′E | Thailand | |
| 14°18′N 105°0′E | Cambodia | Passing just east of Phnom Penh (at 11°34′N 104°55′E) |
| 10°40′N 105°0′E | Vietnam | |
| 8°35′N 105°0′E | South China Sea | Passing just east of Lingga Island, Indonesia (at 0°18′S 105°0′E); Passing just west of Bangka Island, Indonesia (at 2°1′S 105°6′E) |
| 2°21′S 105°0′E | Indonesia | Island of Sumatra |
| 5°43′S 105°0′E | Indian Ocean | Passing just west of the island of Panaitan, Indonesia (at 6°36′S 105°6′E); Passing just west of the island of Java, Indonesia (at 6°45′S 105°12′E) |
| 60°0′S 105°0′E | Southern Ocean | |
| 66°4′S 105°0′E | Antarctica | Australian Antarctic Territory, claimed by Australia |

| Next westward: 104th meridian east | 105th meridian east forms a great circle with 75th meridian west | Next eastward: 106th meridian east |
