= Women's Euro Winners Cup =

- Logo introduced in 2022.
- Organiser(s): BSWW
- Founded: 2015; 11 years ago
- Region: Europe (UEFA)
- Teams: 24
- Related competitions: Euro Winners Cup
- Current champions: (Spain) Higicontrol Melilla (4th title)
- Most championships: (Spain) Higicontrol Melilla (4 titles)
- Website: Beach Soccer Worldwide
- 2026 Women's Euro Winners Cup

The Women's Euro Winners Cup (WEWC) is an annual continental beach soccer club competition contested between top-division European women's teams; the clubs that are their country's national league/cup champions (and, for some nations, one or more runners-up) from countries all across Europe take part. Organised by Beach Soccer Worldwide (BSWW), the championship is viewed as beach soccer's rudimentary version of the UEFA Women's Champions League in its parent sport, association football.

Offering the strongest level of club competition in Europe, it is the most prestigious women's club beach soccer championship in Europe; the winners become continental champions. The first edition took place in 2016, following the founding of the men's edition three years prior. It takes place within the framework of the larger men's version of the tournament, happening during the same dates and location over the course of about a week.

Higicontrol Melilla of Spain are the most successful club with four titles and are also the current champions.

== Organisation ==
As of 2022

=== Founding ===
WEWC former logo timeline

2016–2021.

Beach Soccer Worldwide (BSWW) publicly announced the creation of the championship in December 2015, coming off the back of the multiple successful stagings of the men's edition since 2013. They cited the many women's national leagues/cups in Europe and their "strongest commitment" to begin ramping up the development of women's beach soccer as the reasons for its creation.

=== Qualification ===
From each European nation, the champions of their highest level of women's beach soccer competition (be it a national league or knockout cup) qualify for the event.

In countries where women's clubs exist but a national women's league/cup does not yet take place, clubs can contact BSWW to register themselves as that country's representative.

If a national association wishes to enter additional clubs who are not an incumbent league champion, they can request for permission to do so from the organisers BSWW who will grant or reject the clubs a berth at the tournament depending on the total number of teams already registered.

In 2020 and 2021, qualification was completely abandoned due to health concerns and travel constraints caused by the COVID-19 pandemic meaning many clubs could not compete. The competition was opened up to simply any club in Europe that was able and willing to participate; the competition format was also altered accordingly for these editions.

=== Format ===
The tournament starts with the group stage. The clubs are split into groups (typically of four) and compete in a round robin format. At the end of the group stage, the top 16 clubs advance to the knockout stage. The teams then compete in single-elimination matches; the round of 16, quarter-finals, semi-finals and ending with the final. Consolation matches are also played to determine the final rankings involving the clubs knocked out of these rounds.

== Results ==
Year	Location	№ of clubs	Final			Third place play-off		
Year	Location	№ of clubs	Winners	Result	Runners-up	Third place	Result	Fourth place
2016	Catania, Italy	12	Grasshoppers (Switzerland)	5–4	(Germany) BeachKick Berlin	Zvezda (Russia)	5–3	(Italy) Catanzaro
2017	Nazaré, Portugal	19	Havana Shots Aargau (Switzerland)	4–3 (a.e.t.)	(England) Portsmouth	Higicontrol Melilla (Spain)	4–3	(Russia) Zvezda
2018	Nazaré, Portugal	20	Zvezda (Russia)	2–0	(England) Portsmouth	San Javier (Spain)	3–1	(France) Amnéville
2019	Nazaré, Portugal	20	San Javier (Spain)	3–3 (a.e.t.)^{[A]}	(Spain) Madrid CFF	Reims (France)	9–3	(Italy) Lokrians
2020	Nazaré, Portugal	5	Mriya 2006 (Ukraine)	[round-robin]	(Spain) Cáceres	Zvezda (Russia)	[round-robin]	(France) Marseille BT
2021	Nazaré, Portugal	17	Madrid CFF (Spain)	6–3	(Russia) Zvezda	Bonaire Terrassa (Spain)	5–5 (a.e.t.)^{[B]}	(France) Marseille BT
2022	Nazaré, Portugal	17	Bonaire Terrassa (Spain)	5–3	(Spain) San Javier	Marseille BT (France)	3–2	(Spain) Higicontrol Melilla
2023	Nazaré, Portugal	20	Higicontrol Melilla (Spain)	3–1	(Poland) FC10 Ladies	Bonaire Terrassa (Spain)	6–1	(Spain) San Javier
2024	Nazaré, Portugal	24	Higicontrol Melilla (Spain)	4–3	(Poland) Red Devils Chojnice	Huelva (Spain)	4–3 (a.e.t.)	(Spain) Pozoalbense
2025	Nazaré, Portugal	23	Higicontrol Melilla (Spain)	5–0	(Spain) Atlético Torroxeño	Zeeland (Netherlands)	4–3 (a.e.t.)	(England) Isle of Wight
2026	Nazaré, Portugal	24	Higicontrol Melilla (Spain)	2–1	(Spain) Barcelona BSC	Red Devils Chojnice (Poland)	7–4	(Portugal) O Sótão

A. San Javier won the penalty shootout 2–0.
B. Bonaire Terrassa won the penalty shootout 6–5.
Round robin. Indicates this edition was played as a round-robin tournament. There was no final or third place match.

== Performance ==
=== Successful clubs ===
Team	Winners	Runners-up	Third place
(Spain) Higicontrol Melilla	4 (2023, 2024, 2025, 2026)	–	1 (2017)
(Russia) Zvezda	1 (2018)	1 (2021)	2 (2016, 2020)
(Spain) San Javier	1 (2019)	1 (2022)	1 (2018)
(Spain) Madrid CFF	1 (2021)	1 (2019)	–
(Spain) Bonaire Terrassa	1 (2022)	–	2 (2021, 2023)
(Ukraine) Mriya 2006	1 (2020)	–	–
(Switzerland) Havana Shots Aargau	1 (2017)	–	–
(Switzerland) Grasshoppers	1 (2016)	–	–
(England) Portsmouth	–	2 (2017, 2018)	–
(Poland) Red Devils Chojnice	–	1 (2024)	1 (2026)
(Spain) Barcelona BSC	–	1 (2026)	–
(Spain) Atlético Torroxeño	–	1 (2025)	–
(Poland) FC10 Ladies	–	1 (2023)	–
(Spain) Cáceres	–	1 (2020)	–
(Germany) BeachKick Berlin	–	1 (2016)	–
(Netherlands) Zeeland	–	–	1 (2025)
(Spain) Huelva	–	–	1 (2024)
(France) Marseille BT	–	–	1 (2022)
(France) Reims	–	–	1 (2019)

=== Successful nations ===
Nation	Winners	Runners-up	Third place
Spain	7	5	5
Switzerland	2	0	0
Russia	1	1	2
Ukraine	1	0	0
Poland	0	2	1
England	0	2	0
Germany	0	1	0
France	0	0	2
Netherlands	0	0	1

=== Awards ===
Year	Top goalscorer(s)	Gls	Best player	Best goalkeeper	Ref.
2016	(Russia) Marina Fedorova ( (Russia) Zvezda)	18	(Germany) Rebecca Gabriel ( (Germany) BeachKick Berlin)	(Switzerland) Susanne Shutz ( (Switzerland) Grasshoppers)	
2017	(Russia) Glafira Bazhanova ( (Russia) Neva)	13	(England) Sarah Kempson ( (England) Portsmouth)	(Switzerland) Deborah Kehrli ( (Switzerland) Havana Shots Aargau)	
2018	(Portugal) Mélissa Gomes ( (France) Amnéville)	14	(England) Molly Clark ( (England) Portsmouth)	(Russia) Viktoriia Silina ( (Russia) Zvezda)	
2019	(Portugal) Mélissa Gomes ( (France) Reims)	14	(Spain) Carol Glez ( (Spain) San Javier)	(United States) Phallon Tullis-Joyce ( (France) Reims)	
2020	(Belgium) Anaëlle Wiard ( (Belgium) Newteam Brussels)	6	(Spain) María Herrero ( (Spain) Cáceres)	(Russia) Anna Akylbaeva ( Zvezda)	
2021	(Spain) Alba Mellado ( (Spain) Madrid)	14	(Russia) Anna Cherniakova ( (Russia) Zvezda)	(Russia) Anna Akylbaeva ( (Russia) Zvezda)	
2022	(Portugal) Mélissa Gomes ( (France) Marseille BT)	9	(Spain) Cristina González ( (Spain) Bonaire Terrassa)	(Spain) Laia García ( San Javier)	
2023	(Nigeria) Edna Imade ( (Spain) Cáceres)	11	(Brazil) Adriele Rocha ( (Spain) Higicontrol Melilla)	(Spain) Laura Gallego ( Higicontrol Melilla)	
2024	(Spain) Cristina González ( (Spain) Málaga)	13	(Spain) Andrea Mirón ( (Spain) Higicontrol Melilla)	(Poland) Adriana Banaszkiewicz ( Red Devils)	
2025	(United States) Hannah Adler ( (Netherlands) Zeeland)	10	(Spain) Carol Glez ( (Spain) Higicontrol Melilla)	(Ukraine) Anastasiia Terekh ( Higicontrol Melilla)	
2026	(Russia) Varvara Bychkova ( (Italy) Cagliari)	13	(Italy) Fabiana Vecchione ( (Spain) Higicontrol Melilla)	(Brazil) Lelê Lopes ( Higicontrol Melilla)	

=== Appearances & performance timeline ===
The following is an appearance and performance timeline of the countries who have been represented by clubs at the Women's Euro Winners Cup. It shows which countries were represented at each edition and by how many clubs. The colour of the cells indicates the furthest any of that country's clubs progressed in the competition in that edition, corresponding to the key below.

20 members of UEFA have been represented by at least one club in at least one edition to date.

Key

Champions		Group stage
Runners-up	$n$	No. of clubs entered
Third place	×	Did not enter a club
Fourth Place	••	Banned from entering
Quarter-finals^{[a]}		Host country
Round of 16^{[b]}	—	

a. Not used in 2020–21.
b. Not used in 2016–17, 20–22.

Timeline

Years Country	2016	2017	2018	2019	2020	2021	2022	2023	2024	2025	2026	Total
Belgium	×	×	×	×	1	2	1	1	×	1	1	7
England	1	1	1	×	×	×	×	×	1	1	1	6
Estonia	1	×	1	1	×	×	×	×	×	×	×	3
Finland	×	×	×	×	×	×	1	×	×	×	1	2
France	×	2	2	2	1	1	2	2	3	2	2	19
(Georgia (country)) Georgia	×	×	×	×	×	×	×	×	1	1	×	2
Germany	1	1	1	×	×	×	1	1	×	×	1	6
Gibraltar	×	×	×	×	×	×	1	×	×	×	×	1
Greece	×	1	×	×	×	×	×	×	×	1	×	2
Hungary	×	1	×	×	×	×	×	×	×	×	1	2
Italy	3	2	2	3	×	1	×	×	2	1	1	15
Latvia	×	×	×	×	×	×	×	×	1	×	×	1
Netherlands	2	2	2	2	×	×	1	1	1	1	1	13
Poland	1	1	2	2	×	1	1	1	1	1	1	12
Portugal	×	1	1	1	×	2	3	5	7	5	5	30
Russia	1	2	1	1	1	1	••	••	••	••	••	7
Spain	1	3	5	6	1	7	5	7	6	7	6	54
Sweden	×	1	1	1	×	×	×	×	×	×	×	3
Switzerland	1	1	1	1	×	×	1	2	1	2	2	12
Ukraine	×	×	×	×	1	2	×	×	×	×	1	4
Total teams	12	19	20	20	5	17	17	20	24	23	24	201
Total countries	9	13	12	10	5	8	10	8	10	11	13	—

== See also ==
- Euro Winners Cup (men's edition)
