= 2024 Women's Euro Winners Cup =

Tournament details
- Host country: Portugal
- Dates: 10–16 June
- Teams: 24 (from 1 confederation)
- Venues: 4 (in 1 host city)

Final positions
- Champions: (Spain) Higicontrol Melilla (2nd title)
- Runners-up: (Poland) Red Devils Chojnice
- Third place: (Spain) Huelva
- Fourth place: (Spain) Pozoalbense

The 2024 Women's Euro Winners Cup was the ninth edition of the Women's Euro Winners Cup (WEWC), an annual continental beach soccer tournament for women's top-division European clubs. The championship is viewed as beach soccer's rudimentary version of the UEFA Women's Champions League in its parent sport, association football.

Organised by Beach Soccer Worldwide (BSWW), the tournament was held in Nazaré, Portugal, in tandem with the larger men's edition, from 10 to 16 June.

The event began with a round robin group stage. At its conclusion, the best teams progressed to the knockout stage, a series of single elimination games to determine the winners, starting with the Round of 16 and ending with the final. Consolation matches were also played to determine other final rankings.

Higicontrol Melilla of Spain were the defending champions and successfully retained the title, becoming the first club to win consecutive titles.

== Teams ==
24 clubs from ten different nations enter the event.

In accordance with sanctions imposed by FIFA and UEFA in 2022 in response to the Russian invasion of Ukraine, clubs from Russia remain banned from entering this year.

Key: H: Host club \ TH: Title holders

Group stage
Portugal (7)	Estoril	France (3)	Marseille BT
Portugal (7)	Ilha	France (3)	Marseille Minots
Portugal (7)	Nazaré 2022	France (3)	Southern Cévennes
Portugal (7)	O Sótão (H)	Italy (2)	Cagliari
Portugal (7)	O Sótão "B"	Italy (2)	Lady Terracina
Portugal (7)	Pastéis	England (1)	Isle of Wight
Portugal (7)	SandGames Figueira	Georgia (1)	Dinamo Batumi
Spain (6)	FAL Cádiz	Latvia (1)	Riga
Spain (6)	Higicontrol Melilla (TH)	Netherlands (1)	Zeeland
Spain (6)	Huelva	Poland (1)	Red Devils Chojnice
Spain (6)	Málaga	Switzerland (1)	Rappiranhas
Spain (6)	Mazarrón		
Spain (6)	Pozoalbense		

== Draw ==
The draw to split the 24 clubs into six groups of four took place on 16 May.

== Group stage ==
All group winners and runners-up, along with the four best third-placed teams, progress to the knockout stage.

The two worst third-placed teams and all fourth placed teams recede to a set of consolation matches to determine final placements.

Key

- Qualification to the knockout stage
- Recede to placement matches

=== Group A ===
Pos	Team	Pld	W	W+	WP	L	GF	GA	GD	Pts
1	Pozoalbense	3	2	0	0	1	12	5	+7	6 (Note: Ranking is based on head-to-head result)
2	O Sótão (H)	3	2	0	0	1	16	6	+10	6
3	Riga	3	1	0	1	1	7	9	−2	4
4	Dinamo Batumi	3	0	0	0	3	9	24	−15	0

Source: BSWW
(H) Host
Notes:

10 June	Dinamo Batumi (Georgia (country))	3–9	(Spain) Pozoalbense
10 June	Riga (Latvia)	1–5	(Portugal) O Sótão
11 June	Dinamo Batumi (Georgia (country))	4–6	(Latvia) Riga
11 June	O Sótão (Portugal)	2–3	(Spain) Pozoalbense
12 June	Pozoalbense (Spain)	0–0 (3–5 p.)	(Latvia) Riga
12 June	O Sótão (Portugal)	9–2	(Georgia (country)) Dinamo Batumi

=== Group B ===
Pos	Team	Pld	W	W+	WP	L	GF	GA	GD	Pts
1	Higicontrol Melilla	3	3	0	0	0	26	1	+25	9
2	Marseille Minots	3	2	0	0	1	13	9	+4	6
3	Estoril	3	1	0	0	2	5	16	−11	3
4	O Sótão "B"	3	0	0	0	3	3	21	−18	0

Source: BSWW

10 June	Estoril (Portugal)	3–1	(Portugal) O Sótão "B"
10 June	Marseille Minots (France)	0–6	(Spain) Higicontrol Melilla
11 June	Estoril (Portugal)	1–6	(France) Marseille Minots
11 June	Higicontrol Melilla (Spain)	11–0	(Portugal) O Sótão "B"
12 June	O Sótão "B" (Portugal)	2–7	(France) Marseille Minots
12 June	Higicontrol Melilla (Spain)	9–1	(Portugal) Estoril

=== Group C ===
Pos	Team	Pld	W	W+	WP	L	GF	GA	GD	Pts
1	Mazarrón	3	2	0	1	0	8	5	+3	7
2	Marseille BT	3	1	0	0	2	16	10	+6	3
3	Lady Terracina	3	0	0	2	1	8	10	−2	2
4	SandGames Figueira	3	0	0	0	3	7	14	−7	0

Source: BSWW

10 June	SandGames Figueira (Portugal)	0–1	(Spain) Mazarrón
10 June	Lady Terracina (Italy)	3–3 (2–1 p.)	(France) Marseille BT
11 June	SandGames Figueira (Portugal)	5–5 (1–3 p.)	(Italy) Lady Terracina
11 June	Marseille BT (France)	5–5 (3–4 p.)	(Spain) Mazarrón
12 June	Mazarrón (Spain)	2–0	(Italy) Lady Terracina
12 June	Marseille BT (France)	8–2	(Portugal) SandGames Figueira

=== Group D ===
Pos	Team	Pld	W	W+	WP	L	GF	GA	GD	Pts
1	Huelva	3	2	0	1	0	18	7	+11	7
2	Zeeland	3	1	0	1	1	10	11	−1	4
3	Isle of Wight	3	0	0	1	2	7	9	−2	1
4	Ilha	3	0	0	0	3	6	14	−8	0

Source: BSWW

10 June	Ilha (Portugal)	1–9	(Spain) Huelva
10 June	Isle of Wight (England)	2–4	(Netherlands) Zeeland
11 June	Ilha (Portugal)	2–2 (1–3 p.)	(England) Isle of Wight
11 June	Zeeland (Netherlands)	3–6	(Spain) Huelva
12 June	Huelva (Spain)	3–3 (4–2 p.)	(England) Isle of Wight
12 June	Zeeland (Netherlands)	3–3 (4–1 p.)	(Portugal) Ilha

=== Group E ===
Pos	Team	Pld	W	W+	WP	L	GF	GA	GD	Pts
1	Pastéis	3	2	0	0	1	8	9	−1	6
2	FAL Cádiz	3	1	1	0	1	8	8	0	5
3	Red Devils Chojnice	3	1	0	1	1	8	5	+3	4
4	Cagliari	3	0	0	0	3	8	10	−2	0

Source: BSWW

10 June	Pastéis (Portugal)	0–3	(Spain) FAL Cádiz
10 June	Red Devils Chojnice (Poland)	1–1 (3–1 p.)	(Italy) Cagliari
11 June	Pastéis (Portugal)	3–2	(Poland) Red Devils Chojnice
11 June	Cagliari (Italy)	3–4 (a.e.t.)	(Spain) FAL Cádiz
12 June	FAL Cádiz (Spain)	1–5	(Poland) Red Devils Chojnice
12 June	Cagliari (Italy)	4–5	(Portugal) Pastéis

=== Group F ===
Pos	Team	Pld	W	W+	WP	L	GF	GA	GD	Pts
1	Málaga	3	3	0	0	0	28	3	+25	9
2	Rappiranhas	3	2	0	0	1	9	9	0	6
3	Nazaré 2022	3	1	0	0	2	4	11	−7	3
4	Southern Cévennes	3	0	0	0	3	4	22	−18	0

Source: BSWW

10 June	Nazaré 2022 (Portugal)	1–7	(Spain) Málaga
10 June	Southern Cévennes (France)	2–5	(Switzerland) Rappiranhas
11 June	Nazaré 2022 (Portugal)	2–0	(France) Southern Cévennes
11 June	Rappiranhas (Switzerland)	0–6	(Spain) Málaga
12 June	Málaga (Spain)	15–2	(France) Southern Cévennes
12 June	Rappiranhas (Switzerland)	4–1	(Portugal) Nazaré 2022

== Placement matches ==
Matches took place on 13 June.

23rd place
Southern Cévennes	7–5	O Sótão "B"
21st place
Ilha	8–5	Dinamo Batumi
19th place
Cagliari	8–0	SandGames Figueira
17th place
Lady Terracina	3–6	Isle of Wight

== Knockout stage ==
=== Round of 16 onwards ===
Round of 16 losers placement
15th place – 14 June; Report
(Portugal) Nazaré 2022	4
(Portugal) Estoril	1
13th place – 14 June; Report
(Netherlands) Zeeland	4
(Latvia) Riga	6
11th place – 14 June; Report
(Switzerland) Rappiranhas	3 (2)
(Spain) FAL Cádiz (p)	3 (4)
9th place – 14 June; Report
(Portugal) O Sótão	5
(France) Marseille Minots	4

Round of 16
13 June; Report
(Spain) Mazarrón	11
(Portugal) Estoril	2
13 June; Report
(Spain) Huelva	4
(Switzerland) Rappiranhas	1
13 June; Report
(France) Marseille Minots	0
(France) Marseille BT	3
13 June; Report
(Spain) Higicontrol Melilla	7
(Portugal) Nazaré 2022	1
13 June; Report
(Spain) Pozoalbense (a.e.t.)	4
(Spain) FAL Cádiz	2
13 June; Report
(Spain) Málaga	6
(Latvia) Riga	1
13 June; Report
(Portugal) Pastéis	2
(Netherlands) Zeeland	1
13 June; Report
(Portugal) O Sótão	0
(Poland) Red Devils Chojnice	3

Quarterfinals
14 June; Report
(Spain) Mazarrón	2
(Spain) Huelva	3
14 June; Report
(France) Marseille BT	0
(Spain) Higicontrol Melilla	4
14 June; Report
(Spain) Pozoalbense	4
(Spain) Málaga	2
14 June; Report
(Portugal) Pastéis	2
(Poland) Red Devils Chojnice	5

Semi-finals
15 June; Report
(Spain) Huelva	1
(Spain) Higicontrol Melilla	2
15 June; Report
(Spain) Pozoalbense	1
(Poland) Red Devils Chojnice	2
5th–8th semi-finals
15 June; Reort
(Spain) Mazarrón	4
(France) Marseille BT	2
15 June; Report
(Spain) Málaga	3
(Portugal) Pastéis	1

Final
16 June; Report
(Spain) Higicontrol Melilla	4
(Poland) Red Devils Chojnice	3
3rd place match
16 June; Report
(Spain) Huelva (a.e.t.)	4
(Spain) Pozoalbense	3
5th place match
16 June; Report
(Spain) Mazarrón	2
(Spain) Málaga	3
7th place match
16 June; Report
(France) Marseille BT	1
(Portugal) Pastéis	4

==== Championship match details ====
16 June 2024
17:30 WEST (UTC+1)

Higicontrol Melilla	4–3	Red Devils Chojnice
Natalia C. 2'; Jessi 13'; Carol Glez 23'; Sara Tui 31'	Report	2' Banaszkiewicz; (yellow card) 21' Nowak; (yellow card) 32' Gozdek; 35' Świt; 36' Sudyk

Estádio do Viveiro
Referee: Fiammetta Susanna (Italy)

== Awards ==
The following individual awards were presented after the final.

Top scorer(s)
(Spain) Cristina Gonzalez ( (Spain) Málaga)
13 goals
Best player
(Spain) Andrea Mirón ( (Spain) Higicontrol Melilla)
Best goalkeeper
(Poland) Adriana Banaszkiewicz ( Red Devils Chojnice)

== Top goalscorers ==
Players with at least four goals are listed.

13 goals

- (Spain) Cristina Gonzalez ( (Spain) Málaga)

12 goals

- (Spain) Patri Miñano ( (Spain) Mazarrón)

11 goals

- (Japan) Marin Fujisawa ( (Spain) Huelva)
- (Spain) Alba Mellado ( (Spain) Málaga)

8 goals

- (Brazil) Lorena Medeiros ( (France) Marseille Minots)
- (Canada) Louise Arseneault ( (Spain) FAL Cádiz)
- (Brazil) Sil Neves ( (Portugal) Pastéis)
- (Spain) Adriana Manau ( (Spain) Málaga)

7 goals

- (Spain) Natalia Cuadrado ( (Spain) Higicontrol Melilla)

6 goals

- (Georgia (country)) Tatia Shainidze ( (Georgia (country)) Dinamo Batumi)
- (Argentina) Agostina Tasinazzo ( (Netherlands) Zeeland)
- (Spain) Andrea Mirón ( (Spain) Higicontrol Melilla)
- (Spain) María Soto ( (Spain) Huelva)
- (Spain) María Pilar Sánchez ( (Spain) Pozoalbense)
- (Brazil) Danielle Barboza ( (France) Marseille BT)
- (Belgium) Anaëlle Wiard ( (France) Marseille BT)
- (Spain) Laura Mulero ( (Spain) Mazarrón)

5 goals

- (Spain) Lydia Raja ( (Netherlands) Zeeland)
- (Portugal) Jéssica Santos ( (Portugal) O Sótão)
- (Spain) Nerea Miralles ( (Spain) Higicontrol Melilla)
- (Spain) Laura Gallego ( (Spain) Higicontrol Melilla)
- (Poland) Aleksandra Sudyk ( (Poland) Red Devils Chojnice)
- (Spain) Eva Castaño ( (Spain) Huelva)
- (Japan) Saki Kushiyama ( (France) Marseille BT)

4 goals

- (Italy) Maria Vecchione ( (Italy) Cagliari)
- (United States) Marissa Vasquez ( (England) Isle of Wight)
- (England) Alisha Buckingham ( (England) Isle of Wight)
- (France) Laurine Herbster ( (France) Southern Cévennes)
- (Portugal) Marta Simões ( (Portugal) Ilha)
- (Portugal) Inês Bastos ( (Portugal) Ilha)
- (Georgia (country)) Mariam Artmeladze ( (Georgia (country)) Dinamo Batumi)
- (Ukraine) Myroslava Vypasniak ( (Latvia) Riga)
- (Portugal) Petra Niceia ( (Portugal) O Sótão)
- (Portugal) Mariana Prazeres ( (Portugal) Estoril)
- (Spain) Sara Tui ( (Spain) Higicontrol Melilla)
- (Spain) Carolina Gonzalez ( (Spain) Higicontrol Melilla)
- (Spain) Paqui Campoy ( (Spain) Pozoalbense)
- (Spain) Irene Mateos ( (Spain) Pozoalbense)
- (Brazil) Maria Milene ( (Portugal) Pastéis)
- (Poland) Kornelia Okoniewska ( (Spain) Higicontrol Melilla)

Source: BSWW

== Final standings ==
Rank	Team	Result
1	Higicontrol Melilla	Champions (2nd title)
2	Red Devils Chojnice	Runners-up
3	Huelva	Third place
4	Pozoalbense	
5	Málaga	Eliminated in the Quarter-finals
6	Mazarrón	Eliminated in the Quarter-finals
7	Pastéis	Eliminated in the Quarter-finals
8	Marseille BT	Eliminated in the Quarter-finals
9	O Sótão	Eliminated in the Round of 16
10	Marseille Minots	Eliminated in the Round of 16
11	FAL Cádiz	Eliminated in the Round of 16
12	Rappiranhas	Eliminated in the Round of 16
13	Riga	Eliminated in the Round of 16
14	Zeeland	Eliminated in the Round of 16
15	Nazaré 2022	Eliminated in the Round of 16
16	Estoril	Eliminated in the Round of 16
17	Isle of Wight	Eliminated in the Group Stage
18	Lady Terracina	Eliminated in the Group Stage
19	Cagliari	Eliminated in the Group Stage
20	SandGames Figueira	Eliminated in the Group Stage
21	Ilha	Eliminated in the Group Stage
22	Dinamo Batumi	Eliminated in the Group Stage
23	Southern Cévennes	Eliminated in the Group Stage
24	O Sótão "B"	Eliminated in the Group Stage

== See also ==
- Futsal Women's European Champions
