= 2023 Women's Euro Winners Cup =

Tournament details
- Host country: Portugal
- Dates: 12–18 June
- Teams: 20 (from 1 confederation)
- Venues: 4 (in 1 host city)

Final positions
- Champions: (Spain) Higicontrol Melilla (1st title)
- Runners-up: (Poland) FC10 Ladies
- Third place: (Spain) Bonaire Terrassa
- Fourth place: (Spain) San Javier

Tournament statistics
- Matches played: 48
- Goals scored: 302 (6.29 per match)

The 2023 Women's Euro Winners Cup was the eighth edition of the Women's Euro Winners Cup (WEWC), an annual continental beach soccer tournament for women's top-division European clubs. The championship is viewed as beach soccer's rudimentary version of the UEFA Women's Champions League in its parent sport, association football.

Organised by Beach Soccer Worldwide (BSWW), the tournament was held in Nazaré, Portugal, in tandem with the larger men's edition, from 12 to 18 June.

The event began with a round robin group stage. At its conclusion, the best teams progressed to the knockout stage, a series of single elimination games to determine the winners, starting with the quarter-finals and ending with the final. Consolation matches were also played to determine other final rankings.

Bonaire Terrassa of Spain were the defending champions, but failed to defend their title, falling at the semi-finals and finishing in third place. It was won by Higicontrol Melilla of Spain, who won their first title.

== Teams ==
20 clubs from eight different nations entered the event.

In accordance with sanctions imposed by FIFA and UEFA in 2022 in response to the Russian invasion of Ukraine, clubs from Russia remained banned from participation.

Key: H: Hosts \ TH: Title holders

Group stage
| Spain (7) | Bonaire Terrassa (TH) | France (2) | Marseille BT |
| Spain (7) | Cáceres | France (2) | Marseille Minots |
| Spain (7) | FAL | Switzerland (2) | Havanna Shots Aargau |
| Spain (7) | Higicontrol Melilla | Switzerland (2) | Rappiranhas |
| Spain (7) | Malaga | Belgium (1) | Newteam Brussels |
| Spain (7) | Pozoalbense | Germany (1) | Lieberampool |
| Spain (7) | San Javier | Netherlands (1) | Zeeland |
| Portugal (5) | ACD O Sotão (H) | Poland (1) | FC10 Ladies |
| Portugal (5) | Nazaré 2022 | | |
| Portugal (5) | Pastéis | | |
| Portugal (5) | SandGames Figueira | | |
| Portugal (5) | Estoril | | |

== Draw ==
The draw to split the 20 clubs into five groups of four took place on 18 May.

== Group stage ==
The designation of "home" and "away" teams displayed in the results matrices is for administrative purposes only.

Matches take place from 12 to 14 June.

All group winners, runners-up and third-placed teams, along with the best fourth-placed team, progressed to the knockout stage.

Key

- ^{†} – Walkover
- * – Extra-time result
- ^{♦} – Match decided by penalty shootout

=== Group A ===
| Pos | Team | Pld | W | W+ | WP | L | GF | GA | GD | Pts | Qualification | ACD | RAP | FAL | MMS |
|---|---|---|---|---|---|---|---|---|---|---|---|---|---|---|---|
| 1 | ACD O Sótão (H) | 3 | 3 | 0 | 0 | 0 | 9 | 4 | +5 | 9 | Knockout stage | — | 3–2 | — | 3–0^{†} |
| 2 | Rappiranhas | 3 | 2 | 0 | 0 | 1 | 10 | 4 | +6 | 6 | Knockout stage | — | — | 5–1 | 0–3^{†} |
| 3 | FAL | 3 | 1 | 0 | 0 | 2 | 6 | 8 | −2 | 3 | Knockout stage | 2–3 | — | — | — |
| 4 | Marseille Minots | 3 | 0 | 0 | 0 | 3 | 0 | 9 | −9 | 0 | Withdrew | — | — | 0–3^{†} | — |

Source: BSWW
(H) Host

=== Group B ===
| Pos | Team | Pld | W | W+ | WP | L | GF | GA | GD | Pts | Qualification | BON | MAL | PAS | HSA |
|---|---|---|---|---|---|---|---|---|---|---|---|---|---|---|---|
| 1 | Bonaire Terrassa | 3 | 2 | 1 | 0 | 0 | 16 | 9 | +7 | 8 | Knockout stage | — | — | 4–3* | 7–4 |
| 2 | Malaga | 3 | 2 | 0 | 0 | 1 | 10 | 8 | +2 | 6 | Knockout stage | 2–5 | — | — | — |
| 3 | Pastéis | 3 | 1 | 0 | 0 | 2 | 7 | 9 | −2 | 3 | Knockout stage | — | 1–3 | — | 2–3 |
| 4 | Havanna Shots Aargau | 3 | 0 | 0 | 0 | 3 | 8 | 15 | −7 | 0 | | — | 2–5 | — | — |

Source: BSWW

=== Group C ===
| Pos | Team | Pld | W | W+ | WP | L | GF | GA | GD | Pts | Qualification | CAC | SJA | LIE | NAZ |
|---|---|---|---|---|---|---|---|---|---|---|---|---|---|---|---|
| 1 | Cáceres | 3 | 3 | 0 | 0 | 0 | 20 | 6 | +14 | 9 | Knockout stage | — | 4–1 | — | — |
| 2 | San Javier | 3 | 2 | 0 | 0 | 1 | 10 | 7 | +3 | 6 | Knockout stage | — | — | 4–1 | 5–2 |
| 3 | Lieberampool | 3 | 1 | 0 | 0 | 2 | 8 | 14 | −6 | 3 | Knockout stage | 2–7 | — | — | — |
| 4 | Nazaré 2022 | 3 | 0 | 0 | 0 | 3 | 8 | 19 | −11 | 0 | | 3–9 | — | 5–3 | — |

Source: BSWW

=== Group D ===
| Pos | Team | Pld | W | W+ | WP | L | GF | GA | GD | Pts | Qualification | HIG | MAR | NEW | SGF |
|---|---|---|---|---|---|---|---|---|---|---|---|---|---|---|---|
| 1 | Higicontrol Melilla | 3 | 3 | 0 | 0 | 0 | 12 | 0 | +12 | 9 | Knockout stage | — | 3–0 | — | — |
| 2 | Marseille BT | 3 | 2 | 0 | 0 | 1 | 10 | 10 | 0 | 6 | Knockout stage | — | — | 4–2 | 6–5 |
| 3 | Newteam Brussels | 3 | 1 | 0 | 0 | 2 | 4 | 10 | −6 | 3 | Knockout stage | 0–5 | — | — | 1–2 |
| 4 | SandGames Figueira | 3 | 0 | 0 | 0 | 3 | 6 | 12 | −6 | 0 | Knockout stage | 0–4 | — | — | — |

Source: BSWW

=== Group E ===
| Pos | Team | Pld | W | W+ | WP | L | GF | GA | GD | Pts | Qualification | FCL | POZ | ZEE | EST |
|---|---|---|---|---|---|---|---|---|---|---|---|---|---|---|---|
| 1 | FC10 Ladies | 3 | 3 | 0 | 0 | 0 | 20 | 4 | +16 | 9 | Knockout stage | — | — | 10–3 | 9–1 |
| 2 | Pozoalbense | 3 | 2 | 0 | 0 | 1 | 10 | 4 | +6 | 6 | Knockout stage | 0–1 | — | — | — |
| 3 | Zeeland | 3 | 1 | 0 | 0 | 2 | 11 | 19 | −8 | 3 | Knockout stage | — | 2–5 | — | 4–6 |
| 4 | Estoril | 3 | 0 | 0 | 0 | 3 | 6 | 20 | −14 | 0 | | — | 1–5 | — | — |

Source: BSWW

== Knockout stage ==
17th place match
15 June; Report
Havana Shots Aargau | 3 (3)
Nazaré 2022 (p) | 3 (4)

The draw for the round of 16, and allocation of ties to the bracket, took place after the conclusion of all group stage matches on 14 June.

Round of 16
15 June; Report
Higicontrol Melilla | 3
Malaga | 1
15 June; Report
Rappiranhas (p) | 3 (3)
Marseille BT | 3 (2)
15 June; Report
San Javier | 3
FAL | 1
15 June; Report
ACD O Sótão | 1
Zeeland | 2
15 June; Report
Bonaire Terrassa | 8
Lieberampool | 1
15 June; Report
Cáceres | 4
Pastéis | 1
15 June; Report
FC10 Ladies | 7
SandGames Figueira | 1
15 June; Report
Pozoalbense | 1
Newteam Brussels | 0

Quarterfinals
16 June; Report
Higicontrol Melilla | 4
Rappiranhas | 1
16 June; Report
San Javier | 5
Zeeland | 2
16 June; Report
Bonaire Terrassa | 7
Cáceres | 1
16 June; Report
FC10 Ladies | 3
Pozoalbense | 1

Semi-finals
17 June; Report
Higicontrol Melilla | 2
San Javier | 0
17 June; Report
Bonaire Terrassa | 1
FC10 Ladies | 2
5th–8th semi-finals
17 June; Report
Rappiranhas | 9
Zeeland | 1
17 June; Report
Cáceres (p) | 5 (4)
Pozoalbense | 5 (3)

Final
18 June; Report
Higicontrol Melilla | 3
FC10 Ladies | 1
3rd place match
18 June; Report
San Javier | 1
Bonaire Terrassa | 6
5th place match
18 June; Report
Rappiranhas | 0
Cáceres | 3
7th place match
18 June; Report
Zeeland | 4
Pozoalbense | 7

== Awards ==
The following individual awards were presented after the final.

Top scorer(s)
(Spain) Edna Imade ( (Spain) Cáceres)
11 goals
Best player
(Brazil) Adriele Rocha ( Higicontrol Melilla)
Best goalkeeper
(Spain) Laura Gallego ( Higicontrol Melilla)

== Top goalscorers ==
Players with at least three goals are listed.

11 goals

- (Spain) Edna Imade ( (Spain) Cáceres)

9 goals

- (Spain) Alba Mellado ( (Spain) Malaga)
- (Belgium) Anaëlle Wiard ( (Spain) San Javier)
- (Spain) Cristina Gonzalez ( (Spain) Bonaire Terrassa)

7 goals

- (Brazil) Adriele Rocha ( (Spain) Higicontrol Melilla)
- (Spain) Maria Del Rocio ( (Spain) Bonaire Terrassa)
- (Spain) Maria Corbacho ( (Spain) Cáceres)

6 goals

- (Japan) Saki Kushiyama ( (France) Marseille BT)
- (Poland) Wiktoria Kaczmarek ( (Poland) FC10 Ladies)
- (Spain) Adriana Manau ( (Spain) Bonaire Terrassa)
- (Ukraine) Olesia Malinovska ( (Netherlands) Zeeland)
- (United States) Nikki Haimes ( (Spain) Pozoalbense)

5 goals

- (Germany) Emma Jensen ( (Germany) Lieberampool)
- (Poland) Paulina Bednarska ( (Poland) FC10 Ladies)
- (Poland) Kornelia Okoniewska ( (Poland) FC10 Ladies)
- (Poland) Kamila Komisarczyk ( (Poland) FC10 Ladies)
- (Spain) María Herrero ( (Spain) Cáceres)

4 goals

- (Brazil) Taiane Da Costa ( (France) Marseille BT)
- (Portugal) Joana Pires ( (Portugal) Nazaré 2022)
- (Spain) Andrea Mirón ( (Spain) Higicontrol Melilla)
- (Poland) Katarzyna Gozdek ( (Poland) FC10 Ladies)
- (Ukraine) Myroslava Vypasniak ( (Poland) FC10 Ladies)
- (Spain) Laura Chamizo ( (Spain) Terrassa Bonaire)
- (Switzerland) Sina Cavelti ( (Switzerland) Rappiranhas)
- (Spain) Marina López ( (Spain) Cáceres)
- (Spain) María Romero ( (Spain) Pozoalbense)

3 goals

- (Portugal) Mariana Prazeres ( (Portugal) Estoril)
- (Portugal) Joana Rosa ( (Portugal) Pastéis)
- (Portugal) Joana Flores ( (Portugal) ACD O Sótão)
- (Brazil) Jessica Costa ( (Portugal) SandGames Figueira)
- (Poland) Klaudia Grodzicka ( (Poland) FC10 Ladies)
- (Belgium) Marie Bougard ( (Spain) San Javier)
- (England) Gemma-Louise Hillier ( (Spain) Terrassa Bonaire)
- (Switzerland) Pascale Küffer ( (Switzerland) Rappiranhas)
- (Spain) Carmen Acedo ( (Spain) Cáceres)
- (Netherlands) Sylvana Tieleman ( (Netherlands) Zeeland)
- (United States) Bethany Haynes ( (Netherlands) Zeeland)
- (Netherlands) Sharona Tieleman ( (Netherlands) Zeeland)
- (Spain) Cristina Dominguez ( (Spain) Pozoalbense)
- (Japan) Marin Fujisawa ( (Spain) Pozoalbense)

Source: BSWW

== Final standings ==
| Rank | Team | Result |
|---|---|---|
| 1 | Higicontrol Melilla | Champions (1st title) |
| 2 | FC10 Ladies | Runners-up |
| 3 | Bonaire Terrassa | Third place |
| 4 | San Javier | Placement determined by play-offs |
| 5 | Cáceres | Placement determined by play-offs |
| 6 | Rappiranhas | Placement determined by play-offs |
| 7 | Pozoalbense | Placement determined by play-offs |
| 8 | Zeeland | Placement determined by play-offs |
| 9–16 | ACD O Sótão | Eliminated in the Round of 16 |
| 9–16 | FAL | Eliminated in the Round of 16 |
| 9–16 | Lieberampool | Eliminated in the Round of 16 |
| 9–16 | Malaga | Eliminated in the Round of 16 |
| 9–16 | Marseille BT | Eliminated in the Round of 16 |
| 9–16 | Newteam Brussels | Eliminated in the Round of 16 |
| 9–16 | Pastéis | Eliminated in the Round of 16 |
| 9–16 | SandGames Figueira | Eliminated in the Round of 16 |
| 17 | Nazaré 2022 | Placement determined by play-off |
| 18 | Havana Shots Aargau | Placement determined by play-off |
| 19 | Estoril | Eliminated in the group stage |
| 20 | Marseille Minots | Withdrew |
