= 2022 Women's Euro Winners Cup =

Tournament details
- Host country: Portugal
- Dates: 6–12 June
- Teams: 17 (from 1 confederation)
- Venues: 3 (in 1 host city)

Final positions
- Champions: (Spain) Bonaire Terrassa (1st title)
- Runners-up: (Spain) San Javier
- Third place: (France) Marseille BT
- Fourth place: (Spain) Higicontrol Melilla

Tournament statistics
- Matches played: 49
- Goals scored: 354 (7.22 per match)

The 2022 Women's Euro Winners Cup was the seventh edition of the Women's Euro Winners Cup (WEWC), an annual continental beach soccer tournament for women's top-division European clubs. The championship is the sport's version of the UEFA Women's Champions League in association football.

Organised by Beach Soccer Worldwide (BSWW), the tournament was held in Nazaré, Portugal, in tandem with the larger men's edition, from 6–12 June.

The event began with a round robin group stage. At its conclusion, the best teams progressed to the knockout stage, a series of single elimination games to determine the winners, starting with the quarter-finals and ending with the final. Consolation matches were also played to determine other final rankings.

Madrid CFF of Spain were the defending champions, but did not enter the competition this year. It was won by Bonaire Terrassa of Spain, who won their first title.

== Teams ==
17 clubs from ten different nations entered the event.

In accordance with sanctions imposed by FIFA and UEFA in response to the 2022 Russian invasion of Ukraine, clubs from Russia were banned from participation.

Key: H: Hosts \ TH: Title holders

Group stage
Spain (5)	Bonaire Terrassa	Belgium (1)	Newteam Brussels
Spain (5)	Cáceres	Finland (1)	Kylävainion Päällikot
Spain (5)	Higicontrol Melilla	Germany (1)	Bavaria Bazis
Spain (5)	Huelva	Gibraltar (1)	Gibraltar Wave
Spain (5)	San Javier	Netherlands (1)	Zeeland
Portugal (3)	ACD O Sotão (H)	Poland (1)	FC10 Ladies
Portugal (3)	Nazaré 2022	Switzerland (1)	Rappiranhas
Portugal (3)	Pastéis		
France (2)	Amnéville		
France (2)	Marseille BT		

== Draw ==
The draw to split the 17 clubs into groups took place at 12:00 CEST (UTC+2) on 6 May at BSWW's headquarters in Barcelona, Spain.

== Group stage ==
The designation of "home" and "away" teams displayed in the results matrices is for administrative purposes only.

Matches took place from 6 to 9 June.

The group winners and runners-up progressed to the knockout stage. The third- and fourth-placed teams receded to the 9th–16th place placement matches.

Key

- ^{†} – Walkover
- * – Extra-time result
- ^{♦} – Match decided by penalty shootout

=== Group A ===
Pos	Team	Pld	W	W+	WP	L	GF	GA	GD	Pts	Qualification	HIG	RAP	ACD	AMN
1	Higicontrol Melilla	3	3	0	0	0	20	6	+14	9	Quarter-finals	—	2–1	—	15–4
2	Rappiranhas	3	2	0	0	1	17	5	+12	6	Quarter-finals	—	—	6–1	—
3	ACD O Sótão (H)	3	0	0	1	2	4	11	−7	1	9th–16th place play-offs	1–3	—	—	2–2^{♦}
4	Amnéville	3	0	0	0	3	8	27	−19	0	9th–16th place play-offs	—	2–10	—	—

Source: BSWW
(H) Host

=== Group B ===
Pos	Team	Pld	W	W+	WP	L	GF	GA	GD	Pts	Qualification	BON	PAS	HUE	GIB
1	Bonaire Terrassa	3	3	0	0	0	16	2	+14	9	Quarter-finals	—	3–0	4–1	—
2	Pastéis	3	2	0	0	1	11	7	+4	6	Quarter-finals	—	—	5–3	6–1
3	Huelva	3	1	0	0	2	11	10	+1	3	9th–16th place play-offs	—	—	—	7–1
4	Gibraltar Wave	3	0	0	0	3	3	22	−19	0	9th–16th place play-offs	1–9	—	—	—

Source: BSWW

=== Group C ===
Pos	Team	Pld	W	W+	WP	L	GF	GA	GD	Pts	Qualification	SJA	FCL	NEW	BAZ	NAZ
1	San Javier	4	3	0	0	1	26	4	+22	9	Quarter-finals	—	—	3–4	—	13–0
2	FC10 Ladies	4	3	0	0	1	20	5	+15	9	Quarter-finals	0–3	—	4–2	0–6	—
3	Newteam Brussels	4	3	0	0	1	18	14	+4	9	9th–16th place play-offs	—	—	—	—	6–3
4	Bavaria Bazis	4	1	0	0	3	9	21	−12	3	9th–16th place play-offs	0–7	—	4–6	—	—
5	Nazaré 2022	4	0	0	0	4	5	34	−29	0		—	0–10	—	2–5	—

Source: BSWW

=== Group D ===
Pos	Team	Pld	W	W+	WP	L	GF	GA	GD	Pts	Qualification	MAR	CAC	KYL	ZEE
1	Marseille BT	3	3	0	0	0	15	6	+9	9	Quarter-finals	—	7–3	—	4–1
2	Cáceres	3	2	0	0	1	12	13	−1	6	Quarter-finals	—	—	5–4	4–2
3	Kylävainion Päällikot	3	0	0	1	2	10	13	−3	1	9th–16th place play-offs	2–4	—	—	—
4	Zeeland	3	0	0	0	3	7	12	−5	0	9th–16th place play-offs	—	—	4–4^{♦}	—

Source: BSWW

== Placement matches ==
Key

- w/o – Walkover (awarded as 3–0)

13th place match
12 June; Report
Bavaria Bazis	1
Zeeland	3
15th place match
12 June; Report
Amnéville
Gibraltar Wave	w/o

13th–16th semi-finals
11 June; Report
Bavaria Bazis	w/o
Amnéville
11 June; Report
Gibraltar Wave	0
Zeeland	5

9th–16th quarter-finals
10 June; Report
Kylävainion Päällikot	5
Bavaria Bazis	1
10 June; Report
Huevla	5
Amnéville	3
10 June; Report
Newteam Brussels	10
Gibraltar Wave	2
10 June; Report
ACD O Sotão	5
Zeeland	2

9th–12th semi-finals
11 June; Report
Kylävainion Päällikot	5
Huevla	4
11 June; Report
Newteam Brussels	4
ACD O Sotão	3

9th place match
12 June; Report
Kylävainion Päällikot
Newteam Brussels	w/o
11th place match
12 June; Report
Huevla	5
ACD O Sotão	2

== Knockout stage ==
The draw for the quarter-finals, and allocation of ties to the bracket, took place after the conclusion of all group stage matches on 9 June.

Fifth place
12 June; Report
Cáceres	3
FC10 Ladies	6
Seventh place
12 June; Report
Rappiranhas	3
Pastéis	2

5th–8th place semi-finals
11 June; Report
Rappiranhas	3
Cáceres	4
11 June; Report
Pastéis	1
FC10 Ladies	4

Quarterfinals
10 June; Report
Marseille BT (a.e.t.)	5
Rappiranhas	4
10 June; Report
Bonaire Terrassa	3
Cáceres	1
10 June; Report
San Javier	7
Pastéis	0
10 June; Report
Higicontrol Melilla	5
FC10 Ladies	4

Semifinals
11 June; Report
Marseille BT	0
Bonaire Terrassa	4
11 June; Report
San Javier	3
Higicontrol Melilla	2

Final
12 June; Report
Bonaire Terrassa	5
San Javier	3
Third place
12 June; Report
Marseille BT	3
Higicontrol Melilla	2

== Awards ==
The following individual awards were presented after the final.

Top scorer(s)
(Portugal) Mélissa Gomes ( (France) Marseille BT)
9 goals
Best player
(Spain) Cristina Gonzalez ( (Spain) Bonaire Terrassa)
Best goalkeeper
(Spain) Laia García ( San Javier)

== Top goalscorers ==
Players with at least four goals are listed.

9 goals

- (Portugal) Mélissa Gomes ( (France) Marseille BT)

7 goals

- (England) Sarah Kempson ( (Poland) FC10 Ladies)
- (Switzerland) Sina Cavelti ( (Switzerland) Rappiranhas)
- (Spain) Maria Romero ( (Spain) Huelva)
- (Spain) Saira Posada ( (Spain) Huevla)
- (Spain) Cristina Gonzalez ( (Spain) Bonaire Terrassa)
- (Belgium) Justine Gomboso ( (Belgium) Newteam Brussels)
- (United States) Ali Hall ( (Belgium) Newteam Brussels)

6 goals

- (Poland) Klaudia Grodzicka ( (Poland) FC10 Ladies)
- (Ukraine) Ania Davydenko ( (Poland) FC10 Ladies)
- (Finland) Emilia Jaatinen ( (Finland) Kylävainion Päälliköt)
- (Italy) Fabiana Vecchione ( (Portugal) Pastéis)
- (Spain) Adriana Manau ( (Spain) Bonaire Terrassa)
- (Belgium) Anaëlle Wiard ( (Spain) San Javier)
- (Spain) Carol Gonzalez ( (Spain) San Javier)

5 goals

- (Poland) Anna Król ( (Poland) FC10 Ladies)
- (Finland) Niina Mäenpää ( (Finland) Kylävainion Päälliköt)
- (Switzerland) Eva Bachmann ( (Switzerland) Rappiranhas)
- (France) Myriam-aÏcha Belkiri ( (France) Marseille BT)
- (England) Molly Clark ( (Spain) Higicontrol Melilla)
- (Spain) María Jesús ( (Spain) Cáceres)
- (Spain) Paloma Lázaro ( (Spain) San Javier)

4 goals

- (Germany) Berni Angstwurm ( (Germany) Bavaria Bazis)
- (Finland) Miia Koppanen ( (Finland) Kylävainion Päälliköt)
- (Switzerland) Vanessa Meyer ( (Switzerland) Rappiranhas)
- (Portugal) Érica Ferreira ( (Portugal) Pastéis)
- (Spain) Cristina Dominguez ( (Spain) Huevla)
- (Spain) Estela Fernandez ( (Spain) Terrassa Bonaire)
- (Netherlands) Aniek Van Den Broek ( (Netherlands) Zeeland)
- (Netherlands) Nidia Bos ( (Netherlands) Zeeland)
- (Canada) Louise Arseneault ( (Belgium) Newteam Brussels)
- (United States) Lauren Leslie ( (Belgium) Newteam Brussels)
- (France) Maelys Goumeziane ( (France) Amnéville)
- (Spain) Natalia De Francisco ( (Spain) Higicontrol Melilla)
- (Spain) Maria Soto ( (Spain) Higicontrol Melilla)
- (Spain) Raquel Ayuso ( (Spain) Cáceres)

Source: BSWW

== Final standings ==
Rank	Team	Result
1	Bonaire Terrassa	Champions (1st title)
2	San Javier	Runners-up
3	Marseille BT	Third place
4	Higicontrol Melilla	
5	FC10 Ladies	
6	Cáceres	
7	Rappiranhas	
8	Pastéis	
9	Newteam Brussels	
10	Kylävainion Päällikot	
11	Huelva	
12	ACD O Sotão	
13	Zeeland	
14	Bavaria Bazis	
15	Gibraltar Wave	
16	Amnéville	
17	Nazaré 2022	
