= 2021 Women's Euro Winners Cup =

Tournament details
- Host country: Portugal
- Dates: 12–18 July
- Teams: 17 (from 1 confederation)
- Venues: 4 (in 1 host city)

Final positions
- Champions: (Spain) Madrid (1st title)
- Runners-up: (Russia) Zvezda
- Third place: (Spain) Bonaire Terrassa
- Fourth place: (France) Marseille BT

Tournament statistics
- Matches played: 45
- Goals scored: 352 (7.82 per match)
- Top scorer: (Spain) Alba Mellado (14 goals)
- Best player: (Russia) Anna Cherniakova
- Best goalkeeper: (Russia) Anna Akylbaeva

The 2021 Women's Euro Winners Cup was the sixth edition of the Women's Euro Winners Cup (WEWC), an annual continental beach soccer tournament for women's top-division European clubs. The championship is the sport's version of the UEFA Women's Champions League in association football.

Organised by Beach Soccer Worldwide (BSWW), the tournament was held in Nazaré, Portugal, in tandem with the larger men's edition, from 12–18 July.

The event began with a round robin group stage. At its conclusion, the best teams progressed to the knockout stage, a series of single elimination games to determine the winners, starting with the semi-finals and ending with the final. Consolation matches were also played to determine other final rankings.

Mriya 2006 of Ukraine were the defending champions, but were eliminated at the group stage. The title was won by Madrid CFF, who claimed their first title in their second appearance in the final.

== Teams ==
=== Qualification ===
Usually, to enter, a club needed to be the champions of their country's most recent national championship. If a national association wished to enter more than one club, they could request for permission to do so from the organisers BSWW who would grant or reject the clubs a berth at the tournament depending on the total number of teams already registered.

But as was the case in 2020, due to the effect of the COVID-19 pandemic on the competition, the normal rules regarding qualification were suspended and entry requirements relaxed: the event was opened up to simply any European club that wished to participate.

=== Entrants ===
18 clubs from eight different nations entered the event.

Key: H: Hosts \ TH: Title holders

Group stage
Spain (7)	Bonaire Terrassa	Ukraine (2)	Domino’s
Spain (7)	Cáceres	Ukraine (2)	Mriya 2006 (TH)
Spain (7)	Higicontrol Melilla	Belgium (2)	Newteam Brainois
Spain (7)	Huelva	Belgium (2)	Newteam Brussels
Spain (7)	Madrid	Italy (1)	Lokrians
Spain (7)	Roquetas 2018	France (1)	Marseille BT
Spain (7)	San Javier	Russia (1)	Zvezda
Portugal (3)	CB Caldas Rainha	Poland (1)	Red Devils Chojnice
Portugal (3)	Nazarenos (H)		
Portugal (3)	Pastéis		

== Draw ==
The draw to split the 18 clubs into three groups of six took place at 13:00 CEST (UTC+2) on 7 July at BSWW's headquarters in Barcelona, Spain.

== Group stage ==
The winners of each group, and the best second-placed team, advanced to the semi-finals.

All kickoff times are local, WEST (UTC+1) and were those scheduled; actual times may have differed slightly.

=== Group A ===
Pos	Team	Pld	W	W+	WP	L	GF	GA	GD	Pts	Qualification
1	Bonaire Terrassa (Note: Ranked based on their head-to-head result.)	5	3	1	1	0	23	12	+11	12	Knockout stage
2	Marseille BT	5	4	0	0	1	24	10	+14	12	Knockout stage
3	Lokrians	5	2	0	0	3	28	16	+12	6	9th–12th place play-offs
4	Roquetas 2018 (Note: Roquetas 2018 withdrew after playing two matches, the reasons for which were undisclosed; their opponents in their remaining fixtures received 3–0 walkover wins.)	2	2	0	0	0	9	11	−2	6	Withdrew
5	Newteam Brainois	5	2	0	0	3	19	22	−3	6	9th–12th place play-offs
6	Nazarenos (H)	5	0	0	0	5	9	41	−32	0	13th place match

Source: BSWW
(H) Host
Notes:

12 July 2021	Lokrians (Italy)	1–2	(Spain) Roquetas 2018	Estádio do Viveiro
10:45		Report		Referee: Richard de Bruijn-Rodrigo (Netherlands)

12 July 2021	Bonaire Terrassa (Spain)	3–2	(France) Marseille BT	Pitch 3
14:45		Report		Referee: Filipe Almeida (Portugal)

12 July 2021	Newteam Brainois (Belgium)	8–2	(Portugal) Nazarenos	Pitch 3
18:45		Report		Referee: Jurijs Ivusins (Latvia)

13 July 2021	Marseille BT (France)	6–1	(Belgium) Newteam Brainois	Pitch 3
10:45		Report		Referee: Raffaele Delvecchio (Italy)

13 July 2021	Lokrians (Italy)	5–5 (a.e.t.) (3–4 p)	(Spain) Bonaire Terrassa	Estádio do Viveiro
10:45		Report		Referee: Tomasz Winiarczyk (Poland)

13 July 2021	Nazarenos (Portugal)	1–7	(Spain) Roquetas 2018	Pitch 3
18:45		Report		Referee: Fiammetta Susanna (Italy)

14 July 2021	Lokrians (Italy)	3–4	(France) Marseille BT	Pitch 3
14:45		Report		Referee: Tiago Alexandre Martins Silva (Portugal)

14 July 2021	Nazarenos (Portugal)	1–7	(Spain) Bonaire Terrassa	Pitch 3
17:15		Report		Referee: Emmanuel Vocale (Belgium)

15 July 2021	Roquetas 2018 (Spain)	0–3 w/o	(Belgium) Newteam Brainois	Estádio do Viveiro
08:15		Report		Referee: Filipe Almeida (Portugal)

15 July 2021	Nazarenos (Portugal)	3–9	(France) Marseille BT	Estádio do Viveiro
17:15		Report		Referee: Raffaele Delvecchio (Italy)

15 July 2021	Lokrians (Italy)	9–3	(Belgium) Newteam Brainois	Pitch 2
18:45		Report		Referee: Richard de Bruijn-Rodrigo (Netherlands)

15 July 2021	Bonaire Terrassa (Spain)	3–0 w/o	(Spain) Roquetas 2018	Estádio do Viveiro
18:45		Report		Referee: Antonio Almeida (Portugal)

16 July 2021	Roquetas 2018 (Spain)	0–3 w/o	(France) Marseille BT	Pitch 2
14:45		Report		Referee: Fiammetta Susanna (Italy)

16 July 2021	Nazarenos (Portugal)	2–10	(Italy) Lokrians	Pitch 2
16:00		Report		Referee: Mehdi Sayoud (Belgium)

16 July 2021	Newteam Brainois (Belgium)	5–6 (a.e.t.)	(Spain) Bonaire Terrassa	Estádio do Viveiro
11:45		Report		Referee: Georgios Fitsas (Greece)

=== Group B ===
Pos	Team	Pld	W	W+	WP	L	GF	GA	GD	Pts	Qualification
1	Madrid	4	3	0	0	1	18	9	+9	9	Knockout stage
2	Mriya 2006	4	2	1	0	1	13	9	+4	8	5th–8th place play-offs
3	Newteam Brussels	4	2	0	0	2	12	11	+1	6	5th–8th place play-offs
4	Cáceres (Note: Cáceres withdrew after playing one match due to numerous players and staff receiving exposure notifications for coming into close contact with persons testing positive for COVID-19; their opponents in their remaining fixtures received 3–0 walkover wins.)	1	1	0	0	0	6	10	−4	3	Withdrew
5	Huelva (Note: Huelva withdrew after playing two matches due to a member of the team testing positive for COVID-19; their opponents in their remaining fixtures received 3–0 walkover wins.)	2	1	0	0	1	4	14	−10	3	Withdrew
–	CB Caldas Rainha (Note: CB Caldas Rainha withdrew after the draw but before the tournament began.)	0	0	0	0	0	0	0	0	0	Withdrew

Source: BSWW
Notes:

12 July 2021	Newteam Brussels (Belgium)	4–8	(Spain) Madrid	Pitch 3
12:00		Report		Referee: Pierre Bonnici (Malta)

12 July 2021	Cáceres (Spain)	6–1	(Spain) Huelva	Estádio do Viveiro
13:30		Report		Referee: Fiammetta Susanna (Italy)

12 July 2021	CB Caldas Rainha (Portugal)	Cancelled	(Ukraine) Mriya 2006	—
16:00

13 July 2021	CB Caldas Rainha (Portugal)	Cancelled	(Spain) Madrid	—
12:00

13 July 2021	Cáceres (Spain)	0–3 w/o	(Belgium) Newteam Brussels	Pitch 3
14:45		Report		Referee: Francisco Costa (Portugal)

13 July 2021	Mriya 2006 (Ukraine)	2–3	(Spain) Huelva	Pitch 3
16:00		Report		Referee: Csaba Baghy (Hungary)

14 July 2021	CB Caldas Rainha (Portugal)	Cancelled	(Spain) Huelva	—
10:45

14 July 2021	Mriya 2006 (Ukraine)	4–2	(Belgium) Newteam Brussels	Estádio do Viveiro
13:30		Report		Referee: Richard de Bruijn-Rodrigo (Netherlands)

14 July 2021	Cáceres (Spain)	0–3 w/o	(Spain) Madrid	Pitch 3
16:00		Report		Referee: Wilson Soares (Portugal)

15 July 2021	CB Caldas Rainha (Portugal)	Cancelled	(Spain) Cáceres	—
09:30

15 July 2021	Newteam Brussels (Belgium)	3–0 w/o	(Spain) Huelva	Pitch 3
10:45		Report		Referee: Vasileios Fitsas (Greece)

15 July 2021	Mriya 2006 (Ukraine)	5–4 (a.e.t.)	(Spain) Madrid	Estádio do Viveiro
14:45		Report		Referee: Csaba Baghy (Hungary)

16 July 2021	Huelva (Spain)	0–3 w/o	(Spain) Madrid	Pitch 2
10:30		Report		Referee: Richard de Bruijn-Rodrigo (Netherlands)

16 July 2021	Mriya 2006 (Ukraine)	3–0 w/o	(Spain) Cáceres	Estádio do Viveiro
11:45		Report		Referee: Luca Romani (Italy)

16 July 2021	CB Caldas Rainha (Portugal)	Cancelled	(Belgium) Newteam Brussels	—
11:45

=== Group C ===
Pos	Team	Pld	W	W+	WP	L	GF	GA	GD	Pts	Qualification
1	Zvezda	5	5	0	0	0	28	15	+13	15	Knockout stage
2	San Javier	5	3	0	1	1	18	10	+8	10	5th–8th place play-offs
3	Higicontrol Melilla	5	3	0	0	2	20	11	+9	9	5th–8th place play-offs
4	Domino's	5	2	0	0	3	25	20	+5	6	9th–12th place play-offs
5	Pastéis	5	1	0	0	4	8	25	−17	3	9th–12th place play-offs
6	Red Devils Chojnice	5	0	0	0	5	8	26	−18	0	13th place match

Source: BSWW

12 July 2021	Red Devils Chojnice (Poland)	1–4	(Spain) Higicontrol Melilla	Pitch 3
10:45		Report		Referee: Emmanuel Vocale (Belgium)

12 July 2021	Domino's (Ukraine)	2–4	(Spain) San Javier	Pitch 3
13:30		Report		Referee: Alfredo Pavone (Italy)

12 July 2021	Zvezda (Russia)	4–3	(Portugal) Pastéis	Pitch 3
17:15		Report		Referee: Emmanuel Vocale (Belgium)

13 July 2021	San Javier (Spain)	3–2	(Poland) Red Devils Chojnice	Estádio do Viveiro
13:30		Report		Referee: Vasileios Fitsas (Greece)

13 July 2021	Higicontrol Melilla (Spain)	7–0	(Portugal) Pastéis	Pitch 3
13:30		Report		Referee: Fiammetta Susanna (Italy)

13 July 2021	Zvezda (Russia)	6–4	(Ukraine) Domino's	Pitch 3
17:15		Report		Referee: Raffaele Delvecchio (Italy)

14 July 2021	San Javier (Spain)	2–2 (a.e.t.) (4–3 p)	(Spain) Higicontrol Melilla	Pitch 3
10:45		Report		Referee: Claudio Santos (Portugal)

14 July 2021	Domino's (Ukraine)	8–2	(Portugal) Pastéis	Estádio do Viveiro
10:45		Report		Referee: Mehdi Sayoud (Belgium)

14 July 2021	Zvezda (Russia)	9–1	(Poland) Red Devils Chojnice	Pitch 3
18:45		Report		Referee: Pedro Miguel Oliveira (Portugal)

15 July 2021	Red Devils Chojnice (Poland)	4–7	(Ukraine) Domino's	Pitch 3
13:30		Report		Referee: Vasileios Fitsas (Greece)

15 July 2021	Zvezda (Russia)	5–3	(Spain) Higicontrol Melilla	Pitch 2
16:00		Report		Referee: Luca Romani (Italy)

15 July 2021	San Javier (Spain)	6–0	(Portugal) Pastéis	Pitch 3
16:00		Report		Referee: Georgios Fitsas (Greece)

16 July 2021	Domino's (Ukraine)	3–4	(Spain) Higicontrol Melilla	Estádio do Viveiro
10:30		Report		Referee: Francisco Costa (Portugal)

16 July 2021	Zvezda (Russia)	4–3	(Spain) San Javier	Estádio do Viveiro
13:00		Report		Referee: Vasileios Fitsas (Greece)

16 July 2021	Pastéis (Portugal)	3–0	(Poland) Red Devils Chojnice	Pitch 2
13:00		Report		Referee: Richard de Bruijn-Rodrigo (Netherlands)

=== Ranking of second-placed teams ===
Since Groups B consisted of five teams, for the second placed teams from Groups A and C, their results against the teams finishing in sixth place in their groups were discounted for this ranking.

Pos	Grp	Team	Pld	W	W+	WP	L	GF	GA	GD	Pts	Qualification
1	A	(France) Marseille BT	4	3	0	0	1	15	7	+8	9	Knockout stage
2	B	(Ukraine) Mriya 2006	4	2	1	0	1	13	9	+4	8	
3	C	(Spain) San Javier	4	2	0	1	1	15	8	+7	7	

Source: BSWW

== Placement matches ==
=== Thirteenth place match ===
18 July 2021
09:45

Red Devils Chojnice (Poland)	10–3	(Portugal) Nazarenos
Kilee 1', 15'; Agnieszka 11', 27'; Luisa Erika 16', 25'; Anna 18'; Weronika 19'; Mariana 32'; Dagmara 36'	Report	1' Fartaria; 18' Pires; 19' Carriço

Pitch 4
Referee: Mehdi Sayoud (Belgium)

=== 9th–12th place play-offs ===
Semi-finals
(Italy) Lokrians	4
(Portugal) Pastéis (a.e.t.)	5
(Ukraine) Domino's	6
(Belgium) Newteam Brainois	3

Ninth place match
(Portugal) Pastéis (p)	1 (4)
(Ukraine) Domino's	1 (3)
Eleventh place match
(Italy) Lokrians (a.e.t.)	4
(Belgium) Newteam Brainois	3

==== Semi-finals ====
17 July 2021
09:45

Lokrians (Italy)	4–5 (a.e.t.)	(Portugal) Pastéis
Ferrara 9', 15'; Gomez 13'; Lopes 16'	Report	27' M. João; 27' Rosa; 32', 39' Meira; 33' Garcia

Pitch 3
Referee: Jurijs Ivusins (Latvia)
17 July 2021
11:15

Domino's (Ukraine)	6–3	(Belgium) Newteam Brainois
Kramna 2', 14', 31'; Forsiuk 7'; Postol 7'; Vasyliuk 10'	Report	13' Dutrieux; 19' De Gernier; 23' Mestoura

Pitch 3
Referee: Alfredo Pavone (Italy)

==== Eleventh place match ====
18 July 2021
08:30

Newteam Brainois (Belgium)	3–4 (a.e.t.)	(Italy) Lokrians
Mestoura 1'; Herbster 9', 17'	Report	25', 37' Gomez; 26' Dall'ara; 33' Olivieri

Pitch 4
Referee: Sergio Gomes (Portugal)

==== Ninth place match ====
18 July 2021
11:15

Domino's (Ukraine)	1–1 (a.e.t.)	(Portugal) Pastéis
Shulha 9'	Report	18' Forsiuk
Penalties
	3–4

Pitch 3
Referee: Malte Gerhardt (Germany)

=== 5th–8th place play-offs ===
Semi-finals
(Ukraine) Mriya 2006	4
(Belgium) Newteam Brussels	2
(Spain) San Javier	4 (1)
(Spain) Higicontrol Melilla (p)	4 (2)

Fifth place match
(Ukraine) Mriya 2006	3
(Spain) Higicontrol Melilla	4
Seventh place match
(Belgium) Newteam Brussels	4
(Spain) San Javier	9

==== Semi-finals ====
17 July 2021
12:30

Mriya 2006 (Ukraine)	4–2	(Belgium) Newteam Brussels
Kostiuk 5'; Terekh 5'; Tykhonova 11'; Davydenko 33'	Report	9', 13' Wiard

Pitch 3
Referee: Richard de Bruijn-Rodrigo (Netherlands)
17 July 2021
12:30

San Javier (Spain)	4–4 (a.e.t.)	(Spain) Higicontrol Melilla
Short 2' (o.g.); James 16'; Fresneda 20', 33'	Report	2', 24' Clark; 22' Maria Soto; 31' Nerea
Penalties
Saki (penalty missed); Andrea (penalty missed); Jessica (penalty scored); Carol (penalty missed); James (penalty missed)	1–2	(penalty scored) Haughton; (penalty missed) Nerea; (penalty missed) Maria Soto; (penalty missed) Fanjul; (penalty scored) Clark

Pitch 4
Referee: Emmanuel Vocale (Belgium)

==== Seventh place match ====
18 July 2021
09:45

Newteam Brussels (Belgium)	4–9	(Spain) San Javier
Leslie 3'; Wiard 10', 28'; Van Gysel 21'	Report	1' Fresneda; 3' Jessica; 18', 25' Andrea; 19', 29' James; 21' Carol; 21', 36' Heba

Pitch 3
Referee: Luca Romani (Italy)

==== Fifth place match ====
18 July 2021
11:15

Mriya 2006 (Ukraine)	3–4	(Spain) Higicontrol Melilla
Davydenko 2'; Babenko 35'; Klipachenko 36'	Report	12' Maria Soto; 24' Short; 27', 36' Clark

Pitch 2
Referee: Georgios Fitsas (Greece)

== Knockout stage ==
Semi-finals
(Russia) Zvezda	3
(France) Marseille BT	2
(Spain) Madrid	4
(Spain) Bonaire Terrassa	0

Final
(Russia) Zvezda	3
(Spain) Madrid	6
Third place match
(France) Marseille BT	5 (5)
(Spain) Bonaire Terrassa (p)	5 (6)

=== Semi-finals ===
17 July 2021
09:45

Zvezda (Russia)	3–2	(France) Marseille BT
Akylbaeva 4'; Ivashkina 6', 26'	Report	9' Noele; 28' Adriele

Estádio do Viveiro
Referee: Sergio Gomes (Portugal)
17 July 2021
14:00

Madrid (Spain)	4–0	(Spain) Bonaire Terrassa
Mellado 16', 18', 30'; Sheva 28'	Report

Estádio do Viveiro
Referee: Vladimir Tashkov (Bulgaria)

=== Third place match ===
18 July 2021
11:15

Marseille BT (France)	5–5 (a.e.t.)	(Spain) Bonaire Terrassa
Aina 1' (o.g.); Blanc 8', 22'; Adriele 20'; Lorena 24'	Report	6', 15' Serrat; 21' Adriana; 32' Alba; 32' Nacha
Penalties
	5–6

Estádio do Viveiro
Referee: Murat Gozutok (Turkey)

=== Final ===
18 July 2021
12:30

Zvezda (Russia)	3–6	(Spain) Madrid
Cherniakova 2', 34'; Kanaeva 35'	Report	4', 5', 28', 36' Mellado; 23' Estela; 33' Sheva

Estádio do Viveiro
Referee: Csaba Baghy (Hungary)

== Awards ==
The following individual awards were presented after the final.

Top scorer(s)
(Spain) Alba Mellado ( (Spain) Madrid)
14 goals
Best player
(Russia) Anna Cherniakova ( Zvezda)
Best goalkeeper
(Russia) Anna Akylbaeva ( Zvezda)

== Top goalscorers ==
Players who scored at least four goals are listed

14 goals

- (Spain) Alba Mellado ( (Spain) Madrid)

13 goals

- (England) Molly Clark ( (Spain) Higicontrol Melilla)

11 goals

- (Spain) Natalia Gomez ( (Italy) Lokrians)

10 goals

- (Spain) Maria Soto ( (Spain) Higicontrol Melilla)

9 goals

- (Spain) Adriana Manau ( (Spain) Bonaire Terrassa)
- (Russia) Anna Cherniakova ( (Russia) Zvezda)

8 goals

- (Ukraine) Kseniia Hrytsenko ( (Ukraine) Domino's)
- (Brazil) Lorena Medeiros ( (France) Marseille BT)

7 goals

- (Belgium) Anaëlle Wiard ( (Belgium) Newteam Brussels)
- (Italy) Erika Ferrara ( (Italy) Lokrians)

6 goals

- (Portugal) Joana Carvalho ( (Portugal) Pastéis)
- (Ukraine) Anna Shulha ( (Ukraine) Domino's)
- (Honduras) Ali Hall ( (Belgium) Newteam Brainois)
- (Spain) Carmen Fresneda ( (Spain) San Javier)

5 goals

- (Ukraine) Marianna Kramna ( (Ukraine) Domino's)
- (France) Laurine Herbster ( (Belgium) Newteam Brainois)
- (Brazil) Adriele Rocha ( (France) Marseille BT)
- (Spain) Maria Barquero ( (Spain) Cáceres)
- (Italy) Federica Dall'ara ( (Italy) Lokrians)
- (Russia) Nataliia Kanaeva ( (Russia) Zvezda)
- (Russia) Anna Akylbaeva ( (Russia) Zvezda)

4 goals

- (England) Wendy Martin ( (Spain) Roquetas 2018)
- (Spain) Laura Chamizo ( (Spain) Bonaire Terrassa)
- (Spain) Julia Serrat ( (Spain) Bonaire Terrassa)
- (Ukraine) Iryna Vasyliuk ( (Ukraine) Domino's)
- (France) Julie Bernard ( (France) Marseille BT)
- (Ukraine) Yuliia Kostiuk ( (Ukraine) Mriya 2006)
- (England) Katie James ( (Spain) San Javier)
- (Spain) Andrea Miron ( (Spain) San Javier)
- (Spain) Carolina González ( (Spain) San Javier)
- (Brazil) Letícia Villar ( (Italy) Lokrians)
- (Russia) Iana Zubilova ( (Russia) Zvezda)

Source: BSWW

== Final standings ==
Rank	Team	Result
1	Madrid	Champions (1st title)
2	Zvezda	Runners-up
3	(Spain) Bonaire Terrassa	Third place
4	(France) Marseille BT	
5	(Spain) Higicontrol Melilla	
6	(Ukraine) Mriya 2006	
7	San Javier	
8	Newteam Brussels	
9	Pastéis	
10	Domino's	
11	(Italy) Lokrians	
12	(Belgium) Newteam Brainois	
13	Red Devils Chojnice	
14	(Portugal) Nazarenos	
