= 2026 Women's Euro Winners Cup =

Tournament details
- Host country: Portugal
- Dates: 8–14 June
- Teams: 24 (from 1 confederation)
- Venues: 4 (in 1 host city)

The 2026 Women's Euro Winners Cup was the eleventh edition of the Women's Euro Winners Cup (WEWC), an annual continental beach soccer tournament for women's top-division European clubs. The championship is viewed as beach soccer's rudimentary version of the UEFA Women's Champions League in its parent sport, association football.

Organised by Beach Soccer Worldwide (BSWW), the tournament was held in Nazaré, Portugal, in tandem with the larger men's edition, from 8 to 14 June.

The event began with a round robin group stage. At its conclusion, the best teams progressed to the knockout stage, a series of single elimination games to determine the winners, starting with the Round of 16 and ending with the final. Consolation matches are also played to determine other final rankings.

Higicontrol Melilla of Spain were the three-time defending champions and successfully claimed a fourth straight title, beating fellow Spanish club Barcelona BSC in the final.

== Teams ==
24 clubs from 13 different nations entered the event.

In accordance with sanctions imposed by FIFA and UEFA in 2022 in response to the Russian invasion of Ukraine, clubs from Russia remain banned from entering this year.

The draw to split the teams into six groups of four for the group stage took place on 13 May 2026. Barcelona BSC was unknown at the time of the draw.

Participating clubs in the 2026 Women's Euro Winners Cup
Spain (6)	Atlético Torroxeño	Switzerland (2)	Havana Shots Aargau
Spain (6)	Barcelona BSC	Switzerland (2)	Rappiranhas
Spain (6)	Cádizfornia	Belgium (1)	Brussels Football
Spain (6)	Higicontrol Melilla (TH)	England (1)	Isle of Wight
Spain (6)	Huelva	Finland (1)	HC Terästriitat
Spain (6)	Pozoalbense	Germany (1)	Lieberampool
Portugal (5)	Motor Clube	Hungary (1)	Eger SE
Portugal (5)	Nazaré 2022	Italy (1)	Cagliari
Portugal (5)	O Sótão (H)	Netherlands (1)	Zeeland
Portugal (5)	O Sótão B	Poland (1)	Red Devils Chojnice
Portugal (5)	Pastéis	Ukraine (1)	Mriya 2006
France (2)	Marseille BT		
France (2)	Marseille Minots		

Key: H: Host club \ TH: Title holders

== Group stage ==
All group winners and runners-up, along with the four best third-placed teams, progress to the round of 16.

The two worst third-placed teams and all fourth placed teams are consigned to a set of consolation matches to determine final placements.

Key

- Qualification to the round of 16
- Consigned to placement matches

=== Group A ===
Pos	Team	Pld	W	W+	WP	L	GF	GA	GD	Pts
1	O Sótão (H)	3	3	0	0	0	17	6	+11	9
2	Isle of Wight	3	2	0	0	1	16	5	+11	6
3	Atlético Torroxeño	3	1	0	0	2	7	11	−4	3
4	Eger SE	3	0	0	0	3	2	20	−18	0

Source: BSWW
(H) Host

8 June	Atlético Torroxeño (Spain)	0–4	(England) Isle of Wight
8 June	Eger SE (Hungary)	1–6	(Portugal) O Sótão
9 June	Atlético Torroxeño (Spain)	6–1	(Hungary) Eger SE
9 June	O Sótão (Portugal)	5–4	(England) Isle of Wight
10 June	Isle of Wight (England)	8–0	(Hungary) Eger SE
10 June	O Sótão (Portugal)	6–1	(Spain) Atlético Torroxeño

=== Group B ===
Pos	Team	Pld	W	W+	WP	L	GF	GA	GD	Pts
1	Higicontrol Melilla	3	3	0	0	0	13	2	+11	9
2	Brussels Football	3	1	0	0	2	10	16	−6	3
3	Rappiranhas	3	1	0	0	2	8	7	+1	3
4	Nazaré 2022	3	0	1	0	2	7	13	−6	2

Source: BSWW

8 June	Rappiranhas (Switzerland)	4–1	(Portugal) Nazaré 2022
8 June	Brussels Football (Belgium)	1–7	(Spain) Higicontrol Melilla
9 June	Rappiranhas (Switzerland)	3–4	(Belgium) Brussels Football
9 June	Higicontrol Melilla (Spain)	4–0	(Portugal) Nazaré 2022
10 June	Nazaré 2022 (Portugal)	6–5 (a.e.t.)	(Belgium) Brussels Football
10 June	Higicontrol Melilla (Spain)	2–1	(Switzerland) Rappiranhas

=== Group C ===
Pos	Team	Pld	W	W+	WP	L	GF	GA	GD	Pts
1	Pozoalbense	3	2	1	0	0	11	4	+7	8
2	Havana Shots Aargau	3	2	0	0	1	14	6	+8	6
3	Zeeland	3	1	0	0	2	8	9	−1	3
4	Motor Clube	3	0	0	0	3	5	19	−14	0

Source: BSWW

8 June	Pozoalbense (Spain)	4–3 (a.e.t.)	(Switzerland) Havana Shots Aargau
8 June	Motor Clube (Portugal)	3–7	(Netherlands) Zeeland
9 June	Pozoalbense (Spain)	6–1	(Portugal) Motor Clube
9 June	Zeeland (Netherlands)	1–5	(Switzerland) Havana Shots Aargau
10 June	Havana Shots Aargau (Switzerland)	6–1	(Portugal) Motor Clube
10 June	Zeeland (Netherlands)	0–1	(Spain) Pozoalbense

=== Group D ===
Pos	Team	Pld	W	W+	WP	L	GF	GA	GD	Pts
1	Cádizfornia	3	2	0	1	0	23	6	+17	7
2	Cagliari	3	2	0	0	1	34	7	+27	6
3	Marseille BT	3	1	0	0	2	17	10	+7	3
4	O Sótão B	3	0	0	0	3	1	52	−51	0

Source: BSWW

8 June	Cagliari (Italy)	3–6	(Spain) Cádizfornia
8 June	O Sótão B (Portugal)	1–13	(France) Marseille BT
9 June	Cagliari (Italy)	25–0	(Portugal) O Sótão B
9 June	Marseille BT (France)	3–3 (1–3 p.)	(Spain) Cádizfornia
10 June	Cádizfornia (Spain)	14–0	(Portugal) O Sótão B
10 June	Marseille BT (France)	1–6	(Italy) Cagliari

=== Group E ===
Pos	Team	Pld	W	W+	WP	L	GF	GA	GD	Pts
1	Pastéis	3	3	0	0	0	15	1	+14	9
2	Red Devils Chojnice	3	2	0	0	1	16	5	+11	6
3	Marseille Minots	3	1	0	0	2	16	14	+2	3
4	HC Terästriitat	3	0	0	0	3	4	31	−27	0

Source: BSWW

8 June	Pastéis (Portugal)	5–0	(France) Marseille Minots
8 June	HC Terästriitat (Finland)	0–10	(Poland) Red Devils Chojnice
9 June	Pastéis (Portugal)	8–1	(Finland) HC Terästriitat
9 June	Red Devils Chojnice (Poland)	6–3	(France) Marseille Minots
10 June	Marseille Minots (France)	13–3	(Finland) HC Terästriitat
10 June	Red Devils Chojnice (Poland)	0–2	(Portugal) Pastéis

=== Group F ===
Pos	Team	Pld	W	W+	WP	L	GF	GA	GD	Pts
1	Barcelona BSC	3	3	0	0	0	12	1	+11	9
2	Mriya 2006	3	2	0	0	1	8	5	+3	6
3	Huelva	3	1	0	0	2	4	8	−4	3
4	Lieberampool	3	0	0	0	3	4	14	−10	0

Source: BSWW

8 June	Huelva (Spain)	3–2	(Germany) Lieberampool
8 June	Barcelona BSC (Spain)	3–0	(Ukraine) Mriya 2006
9 June	Huelva (Spain)	0–3	(Spain) Barcelona BSC
9 June	Mriya 2006 (Ukraine)	5–1	(Germany) Lieberampool
10 June	Lieberampool (Germany)	1–6	(Spain) Barcelona BSC
10 June	Mriya 2006 (Ukraine)	3–1	(Spain) Huelva

== Placement matches ==
Matches take place on 11 June.

23rd place	HC Terästriitat (Finland)	11–5	(Portugal) O Sótão B
21st place	Motor Clube (Portugal)	7–2	(Hungary) Eger SE
19th place	Nazaré 2022 (Portugal)	4–3	(Germany) Lieberampool
17th place	Atlético Torroxeño (Spain)	4–4 (1–2 p.)	(Spain) Huelva

== Knockout stage ==
=== Bracket ===
Round of 16 losers placement
15th place – 12 June; Report
(Belgium) Brussels Football	2
(Netherlands) Zeeland	4
13th place – 12 June; Report
(Switzerland) Rappiranhas (a.e.t.)	5
(France) Marseille Minots	4
11th place – 12 June; Report
(Ukraine) Mriya 2006	5
(France) Marseille BT	3
9th place – 12 June; Report
(Switzerland) Havana Shots Aargau (p)	4 (3)
(England) Isle of Wight	4 (2)

Round of 16
11 June; Report
(Spain) Pozoalbense	4
(Ukraine) Mriya 2006	1
11 June; Report
(Spain) Higicontrol Melilla	5
(France) Marseille BT	2
11 June; Report
(Portugal) Pastéis	2
(Switzerland) Rappiranhas	0
11 June; Report
(Poland) Red Devils Chojnice	3
(Switzerland) Havana Shots Aargau	0
11 June; Report
(Portugal) O Sótão	4
(France) Marseille Minots	1
11 June; Report
(Spain) Cádizfornia (p)	0 (4)
(England) Isle of Wight	0 (3)
11 June; Report
(Italy) Cagliari	9
(Belgium) Brussels Football	3
11 June; Report
(Spain) Barcelona BSC	8
(Netherlands) Zeeland	1

Quarterfinals
12 June; Report
(Spain) Pozoalbense	0
(Spain) Higicontrol Melilla (a.e.t.)	1
12 June; Report
(Portugal) Pastéis	0
(Poland) Red Devils Chojnice	1
12 June; Report
(Portugal) O Sótão (p)	2 (5)
(Spain) Cádizfornia	2 (3)
12 June; Report
(Italy) Cagliari	1
(Spain) Barcelona BSC	7

Semi-finals
13 June; Report
(Spain) Higicontrol Melilla	2
(Poland) Red Devils Chojnice	1
13 June; Report
(Portugal) O Sótão	2
(Spain) Barcelona BSC	6
5th–8th semi-finals
13 June; Report
(Spain) Pozoalbense	1
(Portugal) Pastéis	6
13 June; Report
(Spain) Cádizfornia	2
(Italy) Cagliari	6

Final
14 June; Report
(Spain) Higicontrol Melilla	2
(Spain) Barcelona BSC	1
3rd place match
14 June; Report
(Poland) Red Devils Chojnice	7
(Portugal) O Sótão	4
5th place match
14 June; Report
(Portugal) Pastéis	3
(Italy) Cagliari	1
7th place match
14 June; Report
(Spain) Pozoalbense	1
(Spain) Cádizfornia	2

== See also ==
- Futsal Women's European Champions
