= 2017 Women's Euro Winners Cup =

Tournament details
- Host country: Portugal
- Dates: 30 May – 4 June 2017
- Teams: 19 (from 1 confederation)
- Venues: 3 (in 1 host city)

Final positions
- Champions: (Switzerland) Havana Shots Aargau (1st title)
- Runners-up: (England) Portsmouth
- Third place: (Spain) Higicontrol Melilla
- Fourth place: (Russia) WFC Zvezda

Tournament statistics
- Matches played: 50
- Goals scored: 394 (7.88 per match)
- Top scorer: (Russia) Glafira Bazhanova (13 goals)
- Best player: (England) Sarah Kempson
- Best goalkeeper: (Switzerland) Deborah Kehrli

The 2017 Women's Euro Winners Cup was the second edition of Women's Euro Winners Cup, an annual continental beach soccer tournament for top European women's clubs. Organised by Beach Soccer Worldwide (BSWW), the championship is the sport's version of the UEFA Women's Champions League in association football.

Held in Nazaré, Portugal, from 30 May to 4 June 2017 in tandem with the men's edition, the event started with a round robin group stage. At its conclusion, the best teams progressed to the knockout stage, a series of single elimination games to determine the winners. Consolation matches were also played to determine other final rankings.

Swiss club Grasshoppers were the defending champions, but failed to qualify. The tournament was won by Swiss team Havana Shots Aargau who beat England's Portsmouth in the final to win their first European title.

Russians WFC Zvezda were the only team to finish in the top four again having done so in the previous year's first edition.

== Participating teams ==
20 teams entered the tournament (an increase from 12 in the inaugural edition) – the top-level domestic beach soccer league/championship champions plus, for some countries, other top non-champions clubs from the nation indicated.

Group stage
| CD Bala Azul | Terracina Femminile | Viod Driezum | KU AZS UAM Poznan |
| CD Huelva | Terracina Ladies | AO Kefallinia | Vetlanda United |
| Higicontrol Melilla | WFC Zvezda | Astra Hungary | AF Leiria |
| Grande Motte Pyramide | WFC Neva | Beachkick Ladies Berlin | Havana Shots Aargau |
| Amneville | HTC Zwolle | Portsmouth | ~~Atlas AO~~^{1} |

1. Withdrew after the draw

== Draw ==
The draw to split the 20 teams into five groups of four took place on 4 April in the host city of Nazaré, Portugal alongside the men's competition draw.

As the club representing the host association of Portugal, AF Leiria were assigned to Group A. Four other teams were seeded (Beachkick Ladies Berlin, Havana Shots Aargau, WFC Neva, Terracina Ladies) and each assigned to one the remaining groups. The teams were seeded because their national association's club finished in the top four in the previous edition in 2016.

Clubs from the same country could not be drawn into the same group.

== Group stage ==
Matches took place at the Estádio do Viveiro, on one of three pitches as stated.

All times are local, WEST (UTC+1).

=== Group A ===
| Pos | Team | Pld | W | W+ | WP | L | GF | GA | GD | Pts | Qualification |
|---|---|---|---|---|---|---|---|---|---|---|---|
| 1 | WFC Zvezda | 3 | 3 | 0 | 0 | 0 | 19 | 7 | +12 | 9 | Knockout stage |
| 2 | (Portugal) AF Leiria | 3 | 2 | 0 | 0 | 1 | 17 | 9 | +8 | 6 | 9th–16th place play-offs |
| 3 | HTC Zwolle | 3 | 1 | 0 | 0 | 2 | 19 | 21 | –2 | 3 | 9th–16th place play-offs |
| 4 | Amneville | 3 | 0 | 0 | 0 | 3 | 10 | 28 | –18 | 0 | |

| 30 May 2017 | Amneville (France) | 9–10 | (Netherlands) HTC Zwolle | Pitch #3 |
| 13:00 | | Report(ru) |

| 30 May 2017 | WFC Zvezda (Russia) | 4–2 | (Portugal) AF Leiria | Main pitch |
| 18:00 | | Report(ru) |

| 31 May 2017 | Amneville (France) | 1–9 | (Russia) WFC Zvezda | Pitch #3 |
| 13:00 | | Report(ru) |

| 31 May 2017 | AF Leiria (Portugal) | 6–5 | (Netherlands) HTC Zwolle | Main pitch |
| 18:00 | | Report(ru) |

| 1 June 2017 | HTC Zwolle (Netherlands) | 4–6 | (Russia) WFC Zvezda | Pitch #2 |
| 12:45 | | Report(ru) |

| 1 June 2017 | AF Leiria (Portugal) | 9–0 | (France) Amneville | Main pitch |
| 17:45 | | Report(ru) |

=== Group B ===
| Pos | Team | Pld | W | W+ | WP | L | GF | GA | GD | Pts | Qualification |
|---|---|---|---|---|---|---|---|---|---|---|---|
| 1 | KU AZS UAM Poznan | 3 | 2 | 0 | 0 | 1 | 15 | 11 | +4 | 6 | Knockout stage |
| 2 | (Germany) Beachkick Ladies Berlin | 3 | 2 | 0 | 0 | 1 | 12 | 12 | 0 | 6 | Knockout stage |
| 3 | Viod Driezum | 3 | 1 | 0 | 0 | 2 | 16 | 16 | 0 | 3 | 9th–16th place play-offs |
| 4 | Grande Motte Pyramide | 3 | 0 | 0 | 1 | 2 | 7 | 11 | –4 | 1 | |

| 30 May 2017 | KU AZS UAM Poznan (Poland) | 5–6 | (Netherlands) Viod Driezum | Pitch #3 |
| 11:45 | | Report(ru) |

| 30 May 2017 | Grande Motte Pyramide (France) | 1–2 | (Germany) Beachkick Ladies Berlin | Pitch #3 |
| 18:00 | | Report(ru) |

| 31 May 2017 | KU AZS UAM Poznan (Poland) | 4–1 | (France) Grande Motte Pyramide | Pitch #3 |
| 11:45 | | Report(ru) |

| 31 May 2017 | Beachkick Ladies Berlin (Germany) | 6–5 | (Netherlands) Viod Driezum | Pitch #3 |
| 18:00 | | Report(ru) |

| 1 June 2017 | Viod Driezum (Netherlands) | 5–5 (a.e.t.) (1–2 p) | (France) Grande Motte Pyramide | Pitch #2 |
| 11:30 | | Report(ru) |

| 1 June 2017 | Beachkick Ladies Berlin (Germany) | 4–6 | (Poland) KU AZS UAM Poznan | Pitch #2 |
| 16:30 | | Report(ru) |

=== Group C ===
| Pos | Team | Pld | W | W+ | WP | L | GF | GA | GD | Pts | Qualification |
|---|---|---|---|---|---|---|---|---|---|---|---|
| 1 | Havana Shots Aargau | 3 | 2 | 1 | 0 | 0 | 14 | 8 | +6 | 8 | Knockout stage |
| 2 | (Spain) CD Huelva | 3 | 1 | 0 | 1 | 1 | 10 | 6 | +4 | 4 | 9th–16th place play-offs |
| 3 | Vetlanda United | 3 | 1 | 0 | 0 | 2 | 12 | 9 | +3 | 3 | 9th–16th place play-offs |
| 4 | AO Kefallinia | 3 | 0 | 0 | 0 | 3 | 7 | 20 | –13 | 0 | |

| 30 May 2017 | Vetlanda United (Sweden) | 6–2 | (Greece) AO Kefallinia | Pitch #3 |
| 10:30 | | Report(ru) |

| 30 May 2017 | CD Huelva (Spain) | 1–2 | (Switzerland) Havana Shots Aargau | Pitch #3 |
| 16:45 | | Report(ru) |

| 31 May 2017 | Vetlanda United (Sweden) | 3–3 (a.e.t.) (2–3 p) | (Spain) CD Huelva | Pitch #3 |
| 10:30 | | Report(ru) |

| 31 May 2017 | Havana Shots Aargau (Switzerland) | 8–4 | (Greece) AO Kefallinia | Pitch #3 |
| 16:45 | | Report(ru) |

| 1 June 2017 | AO Kefallinia (Greece) | 1–6 | (Spain) CD Huelva | Pitch #2 |
| 10:15 | | Report(ru) |

| 1 June 2017 | Havana Shots Aargau (Switzerland) | 4–3 (a.e.t.) | (Sweden) Vetlanda United | Pitch #3 |
| 16:30 | | Report(ru) |

=== Group D ===
| Pos | Team | Pld | W | W+ | WP | L | GF | GA | GD | Pts | Qualification |
|---|---|---|---|---|---|---|---|---|---|---|---|
| 1 | Higicontrol Melilla | 3 | 2 | 0 | 0 | 1 | 11 | 10 | +1 | 6 | Knockout stage |
| 2 | (Italy) Terracina Femminile | 3 | 1 | 0 | 1 | 1 | 12 | 12 | 0 | 4 | Knockout stage |
| 3 | WFC Neva | 3 | 1 | 0 | 0 | 2 | 11 | 12 | –1 | 3 | 9th–16th place play-offs |
| 4 | Astra Hungary | 3 | 1 | 0 | 0 | 2 | 11 | 11 | 0 | 3 | 9th–16th place play-offs |

| 30 May 2017 | Higicontrol Melilla (Spain) | 5–3 | (Italy) Terracina Femminile | Pitch #3 |
| 09:15 | | Report(ru) |

| 30 May 2017 | Astra Hungary | 3–5 | (Russia) WFC Neva | Pitch #3 |
| 15:30 | | Report(ru) |

| 31 May 2017 | Higicontrol Melilla (Spain) | 2–4 | Astra Hungary | Pitch #3 |
| 09:15 | | Report(ru) |

| 31 May 2017 | WFC Neva (Russia) | 3–5 | (Italy) Terracina Femminile | Pitch #3 |
| 15:30 | | Report(ru) |

| 1 June 2017 | Terracina Femminile (Italy) | 4–4 (a.e.t.) (2–1 p) | Astra Hungary | Pitch #2 |
| 09:00 | | Report(ru) |

| 1 June 2017 | WFC Neva (Russia) | 3–4 | (Spain) Higicontrol Melilla | Pitch #3 |
| 15:15 | | Report(ru) |

=== Group E ===
| Pos | Team | Pld | W | W+ | WP | L | GF | GA | GD | Pts | Qualification |
|---|---|---|---|---|---|---|---|---|---|---|---|
| 1 | Portsmouth | 2 | 2 | 0 | 0 | 0 | 9 | 5 | +4 | 6 | Knockout stage |
| 2 | (Spain) CD Bala Azul | 2 | 1 | 0 | 1 | 1 | 7 | 5 | +2 | 3 | Knockout stage |
| 3 | Terracina Ladies | 2 | 0 | 0 | 0 | 2 | 3 | 9 | –6 | 0 | 9th–16th place play-offs |
| – | Atlas AO | Withdrew | | | | | | | | | |

| 30 May 2017 | CD Bala Azul (Spain) | 3–4 | (England) Portsmouth | Pitch #2 |
| 08:00 | | Report(ru) |

| 31 May 2017 | Terracina Ladies (Italy) | 2–5 | (England) Portsmouth | Pitch #3 |
| 14:15 | | Report(ru) |

| 1 June 2017 | Terracina Ladies (Italy) | 1–4 | (Spain) CD Bala Azul | Pitch #2 |
| 14:00 | | Report(ru) |

=== Ranking of second placed teams ===
The three best runners-up advanced to knockout stage. The ranking of the five runners-up was determined on goal average. Since Group E consisted of three teams, for the runners-up from the other groups (A, B, C, D), their results against the teams finishing in fourth place in their group were discounted for this ranking.

| Pos | Grp | Team | Pld | W | W+ | WP | L | GF | GA | GD | Pts | GAvg | Qualification |
|---|---|---|---|---|---|---|---|---|---|---|---|---|---|
| 1 | E | CD Bala Azul | 2 | 1 | 0 | 0 | 1 | 7 | 5 | +2 | 3 | 1.400 | Knockout stage |
| 2 | D | (Italy) Terracina Femminile | 2 | 1 | 0 | 0 | 1 | 8 | 8 | 0 | 3 | 1.000 | Knockout stage |
| 3 | B | Beachkick Ladies Berlin | 2 | 1 | 0 | 0 | 1 | 10 | 11 | –1 | 3 | 0.909 | Knockout stage |
| 4 | A | AF Leiria | 2 | 1 | 0 | 0 | 1 | 8 | 9 | –1 | 3 | 0.888 | |
| 5 | C | CD Huelva | 2 | 0 | 0 | 1 | 1 | 4 | 5 | –1 | 1 | 0.800 | |

== 9th–16th place play-offs ==
From the group stage, the five teams finishing in third place, plus the two-worst runners-up and the best fourth placed team were knocked out of title-winning contention, receding to play in consolation matches to determine 9th through 16th place in the final standings.

13th place play-off
C2 | (Spain) CD Huelva | 2
A3 | (Netherlands) HTC Zwolle | 3
15th place play-off
D3 | (Russia) WFC Neva | 8
A2 | (Portugal) AF Leiria | 4

13th–16th place semi-finals
C2 | (Spain) CD Huelva | 3
D3 | (Russia) WFC Neva | 2
A3 | (Netherlands) HTC Zwolle | w/o
A2 | (Portugal) AF Leiria

9th-16th place quarter-finals
C2 | (Spain) CD Huelva | 2
E3 | (Italy) Terracina Ladies | 5
B3 | (Netherlands) Viod Driezum | 4
D3 | (Russia) WFC Neva | 3
C3 | (Sweden) Vetlanda United | 2
A3 | (Netherlands) HTC Zwolle | 1
A2 | (Portugal) AF Leiria | 2
D4 | Astra Hungary | 8

9th-12th place semi-finals
E3 | (Italy) Terracina Ladies | 7
B3 | (Netherlands) Viod Driezum | 3
C3 | (Sweden) Vetlanda United | 1
D4 | Astra Hungary | 7

9th place play-off
E3 | (Italy) Terracina Ladies | 3
D4 | Astra Hungary | 11
11th place play-off
B3 | (Netherlands) Viod Driezum | 5
C3 | (Sweden) Vetlanda United | 2

=== 9th–16th place quarter-finals ===
2 June 2017
10:15

| CD Huelva (Spain) | 2–5 | (Italy) Terracina Ladies |
|---|---|---|
| | Report(ru) |

Pitch #2
2 June 2017
11:30

| Viod Driezum (Netherlands) | 4–3 | (Russia) WFC Neva |
|---|---|---|
| | Report(ru) |

Pitch #2
2 June 2017
12:45

| Vetlanda United (Sweden) | 2–1 | (Netherlands) HTC Zwolle |
|---|---|---|
| | Report(ru) |

Pitch #2
2 June 2017
18:00

| AF Leiria (Portugal) | 2–8 | Astra Hungary |
|---|---|---|
| | Report(ru) |

Pitch #2

=== Semi finals ===
==== 13th–16th place ====
3 June 2017
09:00

| HTC Zwolle (Netherlands) | walkover | (Portugal) AF Leiria |

Pitch #2
3 June 2017
10:15

| WFC Neva (Russia) | 2–3 | (Spain) CD Huelva |
|---|---|---|
| | Report(ru) |

Pitch #2

==== 9th–12th place ====
3 June 2017
11:30

| Viod Driezum (Netherlands) | 3–7 | (Italy) Terracina Ladies |
|---|---|---|
| | Report(ru) |

Pitch #2
3 June 2017
12:45

| Astra Hungary | 7–1 | (Sweden) Vetlanda United |
|---|---|---|
| | Report(ru) |

Pitch #2

=== Finals ===
==== 15th place play-off ====
4 June 2017
10:15

| AF Leiria (Portugal) | 4–8 | (Russia) WFC Neva |
|---|---|---|
| | Report(ru) |

Pitch #2

==== 13th place play-off ====
4 June 2017
09:00

| HTC Zwolle (Netherlands) | 3–2 | (Spain) CD Huelva |
|---|---|---|
| | Report(ru) |

Pitch #2

==== 11th place play-off ====
4 June 2017
11:30

| Vetlanda United (Sweden) | 2–5 | (Netherlands) Viod Driezum |
|---|---|---|
| | Report(ru) |

Pitch #2

==== 9th place play-off ====
4 June 2017
12:45

| Astra Hungary | 11–3 | (Italy) Terracina Ladies |
|---|---|---|
| | Report(ru) |

Pitch #2

== Knockout stage ==
The five group winners and best three runners-up progressed to the knockout stage to compete for the title.

5th place play-off
E2 | (Spain) CD Bala Azul (p) | 2 (1)
B2 | (Germany) Beachkick L. Berlin | 2 (0)
7th place play-off
D2 | (Italy) Terracina Femminile | 6
B1 | (Poland) KU AZS UAM Poznan | 3

5th–8th place semi-finals
E2 | (Spain) CD Bala Azul | 5
D2 | (Italy) Terracina Femminile | 4
B1 | (Poland) KU AZS UAM Poznan | 5
B2 | (Germany) Beachkick L. Berlin | 6

Quarter finals
D1 | (Spain) Higicontrol Melilla | 2
E2 | (Spain) CD Bala Azul | 1
C1 | (Switzerland) Havana Shots Aargau | 3
D2 | (Italy) Terracina Femminile | 2
E1 | (England) Portsmouth | 3
B1 | (Poland) KU AZS UAM Poznan | 1
A1 | (Russia) WFC Zvezda | 7
B2 | (Germany) Beachkick L. Berlin | 3

Semi-finals
D1 | (Spain) Higicontrol Melilla | 3
C1 | (Switzerland) Havana Shots Aargau | 5
E1 | (England) Portsmouth | 4
A1 | (Russia) WFC Zvezda | 3

Final
D1 | (Switzerland) Havana Shots Aargau (a.e.t.) | 4
E1 | (England) Portsmouth | 3
3rd place play-off
D1 | (Spain) Higicontrol Melilla | 4
A1 | (Russia) WFC Zvezda | 3

=== Quarter-finals ===
The losers receded to play in consolation matches to determine 5th through 8th place in the final standings.

The winners proceeded to continue to compete for the title.

2 June 2017
09:00

| Higicontrol Melilla (Spain) | 2–1 | (Spain) CD Bala Azul |
|---|---|---|
| | Report(ru) |

Main pitch
2 June 2017
10:15

| Havana Shots Aargau (Switzerland) | 3–2 | (Italy) Terracina Femminile |
|---|---|---|
| | Report(ru) |

Main pitch
2 June 2017
12:45

| Portsmouth (England) | 3–1 | (Poland) KU AZS UAM Poznan |
|---|---|---|
| | Report(ru) |

Main pitch
2 June 2017
15:15

| WFC Zvezda (Russia) | 7–3 | (Germany) Beachkick Ladies Berlin |
|---|---|---|
| | Report(ru) |

Main pitch

=== Semi finals ===
==== 5th–8th place ====
3 June 2017
14:00

| CD Bala Azul (Spain) | 5–4 | (Italy) Terracina Femminile |
|---|---|---|
| | Report(ru) |

Pitch #2
3 June 2017
15:15

| KU AZS UAM Poznan (Poland) | 5–6 | (Germany) Beachkick Ladies Berlin |
|---|---|---|
| | Report(ru) |

Pitch #2

==== 1st–4th place ====
3 June 2017
12:45

| Higicontrol Melilla (Spain) | 3–5 | (Switzerland) Havana Shots Aargau |
|---|---|---|
| | Report(ru) |

Main pitch
3 June 2017
15:15

| Portsmouth (England) | 4–3 | (Russia) WFC Zvezda |
|---|---|---|
| | Report(ru) |

Main pitch

=== Finals ===
==== 7th place play-off ====
4 June 2017
14:00

| KU AZS UAM Poznan (Poland) | 3–6 | (Italy) Terracina Femminile |
|---|---|---|
| | Report(ru) |

Pitch #2

==== 5th place play-off ====
4 June 2017
15:15

| Beachkick Ladies Berlin (Germany) | 2–2 (a.e.t.) | (Spain) CD Bala Azul |
|---|---|---|
| | Report(ru) |
Penalties
| | 0–1 |

Pitch #2

==== 3rd place play-off ====
4 June 2017
14:00

| WFC Zvezda (Russia) | 3–4 | (Spain) Higicontrol Melilla |
|---|---|---|
| | Report(ru) |

Main pitch

==== Final ====
4 June 2017
16:30

| Portsmouth (England) | 3–4 (a.e.t.) | (Switzerland) Havana Shots Aargau |
|---|---|---|
| | Report(ru) |

Main pitch

== Awards ==
Top scorer
(Russia) Glafira Bazhanova ( (Russia) WFC Neva)
13 goals
Best player
(England) Sarah Kempson ( (England) Portsmouth)
Best goalkeeper
(Switzerland) Deborah Kehrli ( (Switzerland) Havana Shots Aargau)

== Final standings ==
| Rank | Team | Result |
|---|---|---|
| 1 | (Switzerland) Havana Shots Aargau | Champions (1st title) |
| 2 | (England) Portsmouth | Runners-up |
| 3 | (Spain) Higicontrol Melilla | Third place |
| 4 | WFC Zvezda | |
| 5 | CD Bala Azul | |
| 6 | Beachkick Ladies Berlin | |
| 7 | Terracina Femminile | |
| 8 | KU AZS UAM Poznan | |
| 9 | Astra Hungary | |
| 10 | Terracina Ladies | |
| 11 | Viod Driezum | |
| 12 | Vetlanda United | |
| 13 | CD Huelva | |
| 14 | HTC Zwolle | |
| 15 | WFC Neva | |
| 16 | AF Leiria | |
| 17–19 | Grande Motte Pyramide | |
| 17–19 | AO Kefallinia | |
| 17–19 | Amneville | |

== See also ==
- 2017 Euro Winners Cup (men's edition)
