= 2019 Women's Euro Winners Cup =

Tournament details
- Host country: Portugal
- Dates: 1–9 June 2019
- Teams: 20 (from 1 confederation)
- Venues: 3 (in 1 host city)

Final positions
- Champions: AIS Playas de San Javier (1st title)
- Runners-up: Madrid CFF
- Third place: Stade de Reims
- Fourth place: Lokrians Beach Club

Tournament statistics
- Matches played: 60
- Goals scored: 468 (7.8 per match)
- Top scorer: (Portugal) Mélissa Gomes (14 goals)
- Best player: (Spain) Carol Gonzalez
- Best goalkeeper: (United States) Phallon Tullis-Joyce

The 2019 Women's Euro Winners Cup was the fourth edition of the Women's Euro Winners Cup (WEWC), an annual continental beach soccer tournament for women's top-division European clubs. The championship is the sport's version of the UEFA Women's Champions League in association football.

Organised by Beach Soccer Worldwide (BSWW), the tournament was held in Nazaré, Portugal from 1 June till 9 June 2019, in tandem with the larger men's edition.

The event began with a round robin group stage. At its conclusion, the best teams progressed to the knockout stage, a series of single elimination games to determine the winners, starting with the Round of 16 and ending with the final. Consolation matches were also played to determine other final rankings.

WFC Zvezda of Russia were the defending champions, but were knocked out in round of 16 by AIS Playas de San Javier from Spain, ultimately finishing in 10th place. AIS Playas de San Javier went on to win their first title, beating Madrid CFF of Spain on penalties in the final.

== Teams ==
20 teams entered the tournament.

=== Entrants ===
Key: H: Hosts \ TH: Title holders

Group stage
WFC Zvezda (TH)	Madrid CFF	Red Devils Ladies	Lokrians
ACD O Sotao (H)	AIS Playas de San Javier	Beach Soccer Zeeland	ASD Lady Terracina
Havana Shots Aargau	CFP Caceres Femenino	DTS Ede	BSC Terracina Femminile
Higicontrol Melilla	Fundacio Terrassa	Marseille Beach Team	Nõmme Kalju
Roses Platja	Lady Grembach EE Łódź	Stade de Reims	Djurgardens IF FF

== Group stage ==
The group stage fixtures were announced on 6 May.

All times are local, WEST (UTC+1).

=== Group A ===
Pos	Team	Pld	W	W+	WP	L	GF	GA	GD	Pts	Qualification
1	Lokrians Beach Club	2	1	0	0	1	9	7	+2	3	Knockout stage
2	ACD O Sotao	2	1	0	0	1	8	8	0	3	Knockout stage
3	Madrid CFF	2	1	0	0	1	6	8	-2	3	

3 June 2019	ACD O Sotao (Portugal)	3–6	(Italy) Lokrians Beach Club
18:00	M. Rosa 13'; Amarante 18'; Cruz 28'	Report	4', 16' Butima; 10', 25', 28' Barboza; 15' Del Pizzo	Referee: Roman Borisov (Russia)

4 June 2019	Madrid CFF (Spain)	4–3	(Italy) Lokrians Beach Club
19:00		Report

5 June 2019	ACD O Sotao (Portugal)	5–2	(Spain) Madrid CFF
18:00		Report

=== Group B ===
Pos	Team	Pld	W	W+	WP	L	GF	GA	GD	Pts	Qualification
1	CFP Caceres Feminino	2	1	0	0	1	7	7	0	3	Knockout stage
2	Stade de Reims	2	1	0	0	1	6	6	0	3	Knockout stage
3	WFC Zvezda	2	1	0	0	1	4	4	0	3	

3 June 2019	WFC Zvezda (Russia)	1–2	(France) Stade de Reims
19:15	Cherniakova 28'	Report	Gomes 30', 36'	Referee: Gary Christien (Belgium)

4 June 2019	CFP Caceres Feminino (Spain)	5–4	(France) Stade de Reims
17:45		Report

5 June 2019	WFC Zvezda (Russia)	3–2	(Spain) CFP Caceres Feminino
19:15	Zaitseva 20', 34'; Bazhanova 34'	Report	21' Guitérrez; 34' Alegre

=== Group C ===
Pos	Team	Pld	W	W+	WP	L	GF	GA	GD	Pts	Qualification
1	CD Higicontrol Melilla	3	3	0	0	0	19	6	+13	9	Knockout stage
2	Marseille Beach Team	3	1	1	0	1	14	17	–3	5	Knockout stage
3	BSC Terracina Femminile	3	0	0	1	2	10	13	–3	1	Knockout stage
4	Beachsoccer DTS Ede	3	0	0	0	3	9	16	–7	0	

3 June 2019	Beachsoccer DTS Ede (Netherlands)	5–5 (a.e.t.) (0–2 p)	(Italy) BSC Terracina Femminile
13:00		Report

3 June 2019	Marseille Beach Team (France)	4–10	(Spain) CD Higicontrol Melilla
18:00		Report		Referee: David Garcia (Spain)

4 June 2019	Beachsoccer DTS Ede (Netherlands)	4–6	(France) Marseille Beach Team
11:30		Report

4 June 2019	CD Higicontrol Melilla (Spain)	4–2	(Italy) BSC Terracina Femminile
16:30		Report

5 June 2019	BSC Terracina Femminile (Italy)	3–4 (a.e.t.)	(France) Marseille Beach Team
13:00		Report

5 June 2019	CD Higicontrol Melilla (Spain)	5–0	(Netherlands) Beachsoccer DTS Ede
18:00		Report

=== Group D ===
Pos	Team	Pld	W	W+	WP	L	GF	GA	GD	Pts	Qualification
1	AIS Playas de San Javier	2	2	0	0	0	15	3	+12	6	Knockout stage
2	BSC Havana Shots	2	1	0	0	1	5	7	-2	3	Knockout stage
3	Red Devils Ladies	2	0	0	0	2	0	10	–10	0	

3 June 2019	AIS Playas de San Javier (Spain)	8–0	(Poland) Red Devils Ladies
11:45		Report

4 June 2019	BSC Havana Shots (Switzerland)	2–0	(Poland) Red Devils Ladies
15:15		Report

5 June 2019	BSC Havana Shots (Switzerland)	3–7	(Spain) AIS Playas de San Javier
16:45		Report

=== Group E ===
Pos	Team	Pld	W	W+	WP	L	GF	GA	GD	Pts	Qualification
1	Roses Platja	2	2	0	0	0	12	3	+9	6	Knockout stage
2	ASD Lady Terracina	2	1	0	0	1	14	4	+10	3	Knockout stage
3	Nomme Kalju FC	2	0	0	0	2	1	20	–19	0	

3 June 2019	ASD Lady Terracina (Italy)	12–0	(Estonia) Nomme Kalju FC
15:30		Report		Referee: Dmytro Dudka (Ukraine)

4 June 2019	Roses Platja (Spain)	8–1	(Estonia) Nomme Kalju FC
14:00		Report

5 June 2019	ASD Lady Terracina (Italy)	2–4	(Spain) Roses Platja
15:30		Report

=== Group F ===
Pos	Team	Pld	W	W+	WP	L	GF	GA	GD	Pts	Qualification
1	Lady Grembach Lodz	3	3	0	0	0	10	5	+5	9	Knockout stage
2	Djugardens IF FF	3	2	0	0	1	15	9	+6	6	Knockout stage
3	Fundacio Terrassa	3	1	0	0	2	6	12	-6	3	Knockout stage
4	Beach Soccer Zeeland	3	0	0	0	3	7	12	–5	0	

3 June 2019	Lady Grembach Lodz (Poland)	3–2	(Spain) Fundacio Terrassa
10:30		Report

3 June 2019	Djugardens IF FF (Sweden)	6–4	(Netherlands) Beach Soccer Zeeland
14:15		Report

4 June 2019	Lady Grembach Lodz (Poland)	5–2	(Sweden) Djugardens IF FF
09:00		Report

4 June 2019	Beach Soccer Zeeland (Netherlands)	4–2	(Spain) Fundacio Terrassa
12:50		Report

5 June 2019	Fundacio Terrassa (Spain)	0–7	(Sweden) Djugardens IF FF
10:30		Report

5 June 2019	Beach Soccer Zeeland (Netherlands)	1–2	(Poland) Lady Grembach Lodz
14:15		Report

== Knockout stage ==
The top three clubs from each group, plus the best fourth placed team advanced to the Round of 16.

In the knockout stage, the clubs competed in single-elimination matches. Consolation matches were also played to determine the final rankings involving the clubs knocked out of each round of the knockout stage.

Main bracket

Round of 16
(Sweden) Djugardens IF FF	5
Havana Shots Aargau	4
AIS Playas de San Javier	5
WFC Zvezda	4
(France) Stade de Reims	5
(Spain) Fundacio Terrassa	3
(Poland) Lady Grembach Lodz	2
(France) Marseille Beach Team	1
(Italy) ASD Lady Terracina	4
Madrid CFF	5
Higicontrol Melilla	2
(Italy) BSC Terracina Femminile (a.e.t.)	4
Roses Platja	4
(Portugal) ACD O Sotao	2
(Italy) Lokrians Beach Club	5
(Spain) CFP Caceres Feminino	4

Quarter-finals
(Sweden) Djugardens IF FF	2
AIS Playas de San Javier	10
(France) Stade de Reims	4
(Poland) Lady Grembach Lodz	2
Madrid CFF	3
(Italy) BSC Terracina Femminile	2
Roses Platja	0
(Italy) Lokrians Beach Club	1

Semi-finals
AIS Playas de San Javier	4
(France) Stade de Reims	1
Madrid CFF	4
(Italy) Lokrians Beach Club	3

Final
AIS Playas de San Javier (p)	3 (2)
Madrid CFF	3 (0)
Third place
(France) Stade de Reims	9
(Italy) Lokrians Beach Club	3

Losers brackets

Round of 16 losers bracket

13th place play-off
Havana Shots Aargau	7
(Italy) ASD Lady Terracina	4
15th place play-off
(France) Marseille Beach Team	2
(Spain) CFP Caceres Feminino	3

13th–16th place semi-finals
Havana Shots Aargau	5
(France) Marseille Beach Team	4
(Italy) ASD Lady Terracina (p)	3 (1)
(Spain) CFP Caceres Feminino	3 (0)

9th-16th place quarter-finals
Havana Shots Aargau	1
WFC Zvezda	7
(Spain) Fundacio Terrassa	3
(France) Marseille Beach Team	2
(Italy) ASD Lady Terracina	0
Higicontrol Melilla	4
(Portugal) ACD O Sotao	4
(Spain) CFP Caceres Feminino	1

9th-12th place semi-finals
WFC Zvezda	5
(Spain) Fundacio Terrassa	4
Higicontrol Melilla	6
(Portugal) ACD O Sotao	2

9th place play-off
WFC Zvezda	3 (1)
Higicontrol Melilla (p)	3 (2)
11th place play-off
(Spain) Fundacio Terrassa	5
(Portugal) ACD O Sotao	4

Quarter-finals losers bracket

5th–8th place semi-finals
(Sweden) Djugardens IF FF	6
(Poland) Lady Grembach Lodz	0
(Italy) BSC Terracina Femminile (p)	5 (6)
Roses Platja	5 (5)

5th place play-off
(Sweden) Djugardens IF FF	3
(Italy) BSC Terracina Femminile	4
7th place play-off
(Poland) Lady Grembach Lodz	2
Roses Platja	1

== Top goalscorers ==
Players who scored at least 5 goals

14 goals

- (Portugal) Melissa Gomes ( (France) Stade de Reims)

12 goals

- (Spain) Carolina González ( (Spain) AIS Playas de San Javier)

== Final standings ==
Rank	Team	Result
1	AIS Playas de San Javier	Champions (1st title)
2	Madrid CFF	Runners-up
3	(France) Stade de Reims	Third place
4	(Italy) Lokrians Beach Club	
5	(Italy) BSC Terracina Femminile	
6	(Sweden) Djugardens IF FF	
7	Lady Grembach Lodz	
8	Roses Platja	
9	Higicontrol Melilla	
10	WFC Zvezda	
11	(Spain) Fundacio Terrassa	
12	(Portugal) ACD O Sotao	
13	Havana Shots Aargau	
14	(Italy) ASD Lady Terracina	
15	(Spain) CFP Caceres Feminino	
16	Marseille Beach Team	
17	Beachsoccer DTS Ede	
18	Beach Soccer Zeeland	
19	Red Devils Ladies	
20	Nõmme Kalju	

== See also ==
- 2019 Euro Winners Cup (men's edition)
