= 2016 Women's Euro Winners Cup =

Tournament details
- Host country: Italy
- Dates: 24–29 May 2016
- Teams: 12 (from 1 confederation)
- Venue: 1 (in 1 host city)

Final positions
- Champions: (Switzerland) Grasshoppers (1st title)
- Runners-up: (Germany) BeachKick Ladies Berlin
- Third place: (Russia) WFC Zvezda
- Fourth place: (Italy) Catanzaro

Tournament statistics
- Matches played: 34
- Goals scored: 321 (9.44 per match)
- Top scorer: (Russia) Marina Fedorova (18 goals)
- Best player: (Germany) Rebecca Gabriel
- Best goalkeeper: (Austria) Susanne Shutz

The 2016 Women's Euro Winners Cup was the first edition of Women's Euro Winners Cup, an annual continental beach soccer tournament for top European women's clubs. Organised by Beach Soccer Worldwide (BSWW), the championship is the sport's version of the UEFA Women's Champions League in association football.

Held in Catania, Italy from 24 to 29 May 2016 in tandem with the men's edition, the event started with a round robin group stage. At its conclusion, the best teams progressed to the knockout stage, a series of single elimination games to determine the winners. Consolation matches were also played to determine other final rankings.

The tournament was won by Swiss team Grasshoppers who beat Germany's BeachKick Ladies Berlin in the final to win their first European title.

== Participating teams ==
12 teams entered the inaugural tournament from nine countries – the top-level domestic beach soccer league/championship champions plus, for some countries, other top non-champions clubs from the nation indicated.

Group stage
Catania	HTC Zwolle	Grasshoppers	UKS Sparta Daleszyce
Catanzaro	DTS' 35	WFC Zvezda	Beachkick Ladies Berlin
Terracina Ladies	Portsmouth	Nomme Kalju	Sogesport Club Esportiu

== Draw ==
The draw to split the 12 teams into three groups of four took place in the morning of 4 May in the host city of Cantaia, Italy alongside the men's competition draw.

As the club representing the host city Catania, DomusBet Catania BS were assigned to Group A. The other teams were then drawn to one of the three groups. Clubs from the same country could not be drawn into the same group.

== Group stage ==
Matches took place at the DombusBet Arena.

All times are local, CEST (UTC+2).

=== Group A ===
Pos	Team	Pld	W	W+	WP	L	GF	GA	GD	Pts	Qualification
1	Sogesport Club Esportiu	3	2	0	0	1	21	10	+11	6	Knockout stage
2	(Netherlands) DTS' 35	3	2	0	0	1	17	10	+7	6	Knockout stage
3	Catania	3	2	0	0	1	14	14	0	6	Knockout stage
4	UKS Sparta Daleszyce	3	0	0	0	3	7	25	–18	0	9th–12th place play-offs

24 May 2016	DTS' 35 (Netherlands)	9–2	(Poland) UKS Sparta Daleszyce
12:15		Report(ru)

24 May 2016	Sogesport Club Esportiu (Spain)	8–3	(Italy) Catania
19:45		Report(ru)

25 May 2016	DTS' 35 (Netherlands)	5–4	(Spain) Sogesport Club Esportiu
12:15		Report(ru)

25 May 2016	Catania (Italy)	7–3	(Poland) UKS Sparta Daleszyce
19:45		Report(ru)

26 May 2016	UKS Sparta Daleszyce (Poland)	2–9	(Spain) Sogesport Club Esportiu
13:30		Report(ru)

26 May 2016	Catania (Italy)	4–3	(Netherlands) DTS' 35
19:45		Report(ru)

=== Group B ===
Pos	Team	Pld	W	W+	WP	L	GF	GA	GD	Pts	Qualification
1	Grasshoppers	3	3	0	0	0	17	9	+8	9	Knockout stage
2	(England) Portsmouth	3	2	0	0	1	12	10	+2	6	Knockout stage
3	Terracina Ladies	3	1	0	0	2	14	14	0	3	9th–12th place play-offs
4	HTC Zwolle	3	0	0	0	3	10	20	–10	0	9th–12th place play-offs

24 May 2016	Portsmouth (England)	5–3	(Italy) Terracina Ladies
11:00		Report(ru)

24 May 2016	HTC Zwolle (Netherlands)	3–8	(Switzerland) Grasshoppers
14:45		Report(ru)

25 May 2016	Portsmouth (England)	4–3	(Netherlands) HTC Zwolle
11:00		Report(ru)

25 May 2016	Grasshoppers (Switzerland)	5–3	(Italy) Terracina Ladies
14:45		Report(ru)

26 May 2016	Grasshoppers (Switzerland)	4–3	(England) Portsmouth
09:45		Report(ru)

26 May 2016	Terracina Ladies (Italy)	8–4	(Netherlands) HTC Zwolle
12:15		Report(ru)

=== Group C ===
Pos	Team	Pld	W	W+	WP	L	GF	GA	GD	Pts	Qualification
1	WFC Zvezda	3	2	0	1	0	21	8	+13	7	Knockout stage
2	(Germany) Beachkick Ladies Berlin	3	2	0	0	1	19	10	+9	6	Knockout stage
3	Catanzaro	3	1	0	0	2	20	11	+9	3	Knockout stage
4	Nomme Kalju	3	0	0	0	3	2	33	–31	0	9th–12th place play-offs

24 May 2016	Beachkick Ladies Berlin (Germany)	8–1	(Estonia) Nomme Kalju
09:45		Report(ru)

24 May 2016	Catanzaro (Italy)	3–4	(Russia) WFC Zvezda
13:30		Report(ru)

25 May 2016	Beachkick Ladies Berlin (Germany)	6–4	(Italy) Catanzaro
09:45		Report(ru)

25 May 2016	WFC Zvezda (Russia)	12–0	(Estonia) Nomme Kalju
13:30		Report(ru)

26 May 2016	Nomme Kalju (Estonia)	1–13	(Italy) Catanzaro
11:00		Report(ru)

26 May 2016	WFC Zvezda (Russia)	5–5 (a.e.t.) (4–3 p)	(Germany) Beachkick Ladies Berlin
14:45		Report(ru)

=== Ranking of third placed teams ===
Pos	Grp	Team	Pld	W	W+	WP	L	GF	GA	GD	Pts	Qualification
1	A	Catania	3	2	0	0	1	14	14	0	6	Knockout stage
2	C	Catanzaro	3	1	0	0	2	20	11	+9	3	Knockout stage
3	B	Terracina Ladies	3	1	0	0	2	14	14	0	3	

== 9th–12th place play-offs ==
The teams finishing in fourth place and the worst third placed team were knocked out of title-winning contention, receding to play in consolation matches to determine 9th through 12th place in the final standings.

9th–12th place semi-finals
B4	(Netherlands) HTC Zwolle	5
A4	(Poland) UKS Sparta Daleszyce	4
B3	(Italy) Terracina Ladies	4
C4	(Estonia) Nomme Kalju	1

Ninth place play-off
B4	(Netherlands) HTC Zwolle	7
B3	(Italy) Terracina Ladies	4
Eleventh place play-off
A4	(Poland) UKS Sparta Daleszyce	1
C4	(Estonia) Nomme Kalju	0

=== 9th–12th place semi-finals ===
27 May 2016
09:45

HTC Zwolle (Netherlands)	5–4	(Poland) UKS Sparta Daleszyce
	Report(ru)

27 May 2016
11:00

Terracina Ladies (Italy)	4–1	(Estonia) Nomme Kalju
	Report(ru)

=== Eleventh place play-off ===
28 May 2016
10:45

UKS Sparta Daleszyce (Poland)	1–0	(Estonia) Nomme Kalju
	Report(ru)

=== Ninth place play-off ===
28 May 2016
12:00

HTC Zwolle (Netherlands)	7–4	(Italy) Terracina Ladies
	Report(ru)

== Knockout stage ==
The group winners, runners-up and two best third placed teams progressed to the knockout stage to continue to compete for the title.

5th place play-off
B2	(England) Portsmouth	6
A3	(Italy) Catania	4
7th place play-off
A1	(Spain) S. Club Esportiu (a.e.t.)	5
A2	(Netherlands) DTS' 35	4

5th–8th place semi-finals
B2	(England) Portsmouth	3
A1	(Spain) S. Club Esportiu	1
A2	(Netherlands) DTS' 35	5
A3	(Italy) Catania	7

Quarter finals
B2	(England) Portsmouth	3
C2	(Germany) Beachkick L. Berlin	4
A1	(Spain) Sogesport Club Esportiu	3
C3	(Italy) Catanzaro	5
C1	(Russia) WFC Zvezda	15
A2	(Netherlands) DTS' 35	2
B1	(Switzerland) Grasshoppers	9
A3	(Italy) Catania	8

Semi-finals
C2	(Germany) Beachkick L. Berlin	8
C3	(Italy) Catanzaro	5
C1	(Russia) WFC Zvezda	3
B1	(Switzerland) Grasshoppers	4

Final
C2	(Germany) Beachkick L. Berlin	4
B1	(Switzerland) Grasshoppers	5
3rd place play-off
C3	(Italy) Catanzaro	3
C1	(Russia) WFC Zvezda	5

=== Quarter-finals ===
The losers receded to play in consolation matches to determine 5th through 8th place in the final standings.

The winners proceeded to continue to compete for the title.

27 May 2016
12:15

Portsmouth (England)	3–4	(Germany) Beachkick Ladies Berlin
	Report(ru)

27 May 2016
14:45

WFC Zvezda (Russia)	15–2	(Netherlands) DTS' 35
	Report(ru)

27 May 2016
17:15

Sogesport Club Esportiu (Spain)	3–5	(Italy) Catanzaro
	Report(ru)

27 May 2016
19:45

Grasshoppers (Switzerland)	9–8	(Italy) Catania
	Report(ru)

=== Semi-finals ===
==== 5th–8th place ====
28 May 2016
10:45

Catania (Italy)	7–5	(Netherlands) DTS' 35
	Report(ru)

28 May 2016
13:15

Sogesport Club Esportiu (Spain)	1–3	(England) Portsmouth
	Report(ru)

==== 1st–4th place ====
28 May 2016
15:45

Grasshoppers (Switzerland)	4–3	(Russia) WFC Zvezda
	Report(ru)

28 May 2016
18:15

Catanzaro (Italy)	5–8	(Germany) BeachKick Ladies Berlin
	Report(ru)

=== Finals ===
==== Seventh place play-off ====
29 May 2016
10:45

Sogesport Club Esportiu (Spain)	5–4 (a.e.t.)	(Netherlands) DTS' 35
	Report(ru)

==== Fifth place play-off ====
29 May 2016
13:15

Catania (Italy)	4–6	(England) Portsmouth
	Report(ru)

==== Third place play-off ====
29 May 2016
15:45

Catanzaro (Italy)	3–5	(Russia) WFC Zvezda
	Report(ru)

==== Final ====
29 May 2016
18:15

BeachKick Ladies Berlin (Germany)	4–5	(Switzerland) Grasshoppers
	Report(ru)

== Awards ==
Top scorer
(Russia) Marina Fedorova ( (Russia) WFC Zvezda)
18 goals
Best player
(Germany) Rebecca Gabriel ( (Germany) BeachKick Ladies Berlin)
Best goalkeeper
(Austria) Susanne Shutz ( (Switzerland) Grasshoppers)

== Final standings ==
Rank	Team	Result
1	(Switzerland) Grasshoppers	Champions (1st title)
2	(Germany) BeachKick Ladies Berlin	Runners-up
3	(Russia) WFC Zvezda	Third place
4	Catanzaro	
5	Portsmouth	
6	Catania	
7	Sogesport Club Esportiu	
8	DTS' 35	
9	HTC Zwolle	
10	Terracina Ladies	
11	UKS Sparta Daleszyce	
12	Nomme Kalju	

== See also ==
- 2016 Euro Winners Cup (men's edition)
