= 2025 Women's Euro Winners Cup =

Tournament details
- Host country: Portugal
- Dates: 9–15 June
- Teams: 23 (from 1 confederation)
- Venues: 4 (in 1 host city)

Final positions
- Champions: Higicontrol Melilla (3rd title)
- Runners-up: Atlético Torroxeño
- Third place: Zeeland
- Fourth place: Isle of Wight

The 2025 Women's Euro Winners Cup was the tenth edition of the Women's Euro Winners Cup (WEWC), an annual continental beach soccer tournament for women's top-division European clubs. The championship is viewed as beach soccer's rudimentary version of the UEFA Women's Champions League in its parent sport, association football.

Organised by Beach Soccer Worldwide (BSWW), the tournament was held in Nazaré, Portugal, in tandem with the larger men's edition, from 9 to 15 June.

The event began with a round robin group stage. At its conclusion, the best teams progressed to the knockout stage, a series of single elimination games to determine the winners, starting with the Round of 16 and ending with the final. Consolation matches were also played to determine other final rankings.

Higicontrol Melilla of Spain were the two-time defending champions and successfully retained the title.

== Teams ==
23 clubs from 11 different nations entered the event.

In accordance with sanctions imposed by FIFA and UEFA in 2022 in response to the Russian invasion of Ukraine, clubs from Russia remain banned from entering this year.

Key: H: Host club \ TH: Title holders

Group stage
Spain (7)	Atlético Torroxeño	France (2)	Marseille BT
Spain (7)	Barriada de la Playa	France (2)	Marseille Minots
Spain (7)	FAL Cádizfornia	Switzerland (2)	Rappiranhas
Spain (7)	Higicontrol Melilla (TH)	Switzerland (2)	Winti Panthers
Spain (7)	Mazarrón	Belgium (1)	Brussels
Spain (7)	Pozoalbense	England (1)	Isle of Wight
Spain (7)	Recreativo de Huelva	Georgia (1)	Batumi
Portugal (5)	Monte Real Academy	Greece (1)	AO Kefallinia
Portugal (5)	Nazaré 2022	Italy (1)	Cagliari
Portugal (5)	O Sótão (H)	Netherlands (1)	Zeeland
Portugal (5)	Pastéis	Poland (1)	Red Devils Chojnice
Portugal (5)	SandGames Figueira		

== Group stage ==
All group winners and runners-up, along with the four best third-placed teams, progress to the round of 16.

The two worst third-placed teams and four best fourth placed teams are consigned to a set of consolation matches to determine final placements.

The worst fourth placed team plays no further part in the competition and automatically finishes in 23rd place.

Group D comprises just three teams. Therefore, to ensure fairness when comparing third-placed teams across all groups, the results of the third-placed teams in the four-team groups against their fourth-placed opponents are not considered when determining the "best" third-placed teams advancing to the next round.

Key

- Qualification to the round of 16
- Consigned to placement matches

=== Group A ===
Pos	Team	Pld	W	W+	WP	L	GF	GA	GD	Pts
1	O Sótão (H)	3	3	0	0	0	18	2	+16	9
2	FAL Cádizfornia	3	2	0	0	1	12	6	+6	6
3	Marseille Minots	3	1	0	0	2	6	11	−5	3
4	Batumi	3	0	0	0	3	2	19	−17	0

Source: BSWW
(H) Host

9 June	FAL Cádizfornia (Spain)	6–1	(France) Marseille Minots
9 June	Batumi (Georgia (country))	0–10	(Portugal) O Sótão
10 June	Marseille Minots (France)	5–0	(Georgia (country)) Batumi
10 June	O Sótão (Portugal)	3–2	(Spain) FAL Cádizfornia
11 June	FAL Cádizfornia (Spain)	4–2	(Georgia (country)) Batumi
11 June	O Sótão (Portugal)	5–0	(France) Marseille Minots

=== Group B ===
Pos	Team	Pld	W	W+	WP	L	GF	GA	GD	Pts
1	Higicontrol Melilla	3	2	0	0	1	13	6	+7	6 (Note: Ranking is based on head-to-head results.)
2	Pozoalbense	3	2	0	0	1	20	7	+13	6
3	Pastéis	3	2	0	0	1	14	6	+8	6
4	AO Kefallinia	3	0	0	0	3	3	31	−28	0

Source: BSWW
Notes:

9 June	Pozoalbense (Spain)	1–3	(Portugal) Pastéis
9 June	AO Kefallinia (Greece)	1–6	(Spain) Higicontrol Melilla
10 June	Pastéis (Portugal)	11–2	(Greece) AO Kefallinia
10 June	Higicontrol Melilla (Spain)	4–5	(Spain) Pozoalbense
11 June	Pozoalbense (Spain)	14–0	(Greece) AO Kefallinia
11 June	Higicontrol Melilla (Spain)	3–0	(Portugal) Pastéis

=== Group C ===
Pos	Team	Pld	W	W+	WP	L	GF	GA	GD	Pts
1	Atlético Torroxeño	3	3	0	0	0	22	7	+15	9
2	Nazaré 2022	3	1	0	0	2	5	10	−5	3 (Note: Ranking is based on head-to-head result.)
3	Marseille BT	3	1	0	0	2	7	7	0	3
4	Winti Panthers	3	0	0	1	2	4	14	−10	1

Source: BSWW
Notes:

9 June	Atlético Torroxeño (Spain)	8–2	(Portugal) Nazaré 2022
9 June	Winti Panthers (Switzerland)	1–3	(France) Marseille BT
10 June	Nazaré 2022 (Portugal)	0–0 (3–5 p.)	(Switzerland) Winti Panthers
10 June	Marseille BT (France)	2–3	(Spain) Atlético Torroxeño
11 June	Atlético Torroxeño (Spain)	11–3	(Switzerland) Winti Panthers
11 June	Marseille BT (France)	2–3	(Portugal) Nazaré 2022

=== Group D ===
Pos	Team	Pld	W	W+	WP	L	GF	GA	GD	Pts
1	Recreativo de Huelva	2	2	0	0	0	6	3	+3	6
2	Red Devils Chojnice	2	1	0	0	1	5	4	+1	3
3	SandGames Figueira	2	0	0	0	2	1	5	−4	0

Source: BSWW

9 June	Recreativo de Huelva (Spain)	2–1	(Portugal) SandGames Figueira
10 June	Red Devils Chojnice (Poland)	2–4	(Spain) Recreativo de Huelva
11 June	Red Devils Chojnice (Poland)	3–0	(Portugal) SandGames Figueira

=== Group E ===
Pos	Team	Pld	W	W+	WP	L	GF	GA	GD	Pts
1	Rappiranhas	3	3	0	0	0	16	5	+11	9
2	Zeeland	3	1	1	0	1	11	7	+4	5
3	Mazarrón	3	1	0	0	2	12	13	−1	3
4	Monte Real Academy	3	0	0	0	3	6	20	−14	0

Source: BSWW

9 June	Mazarrón (Spain)	1–4	(Switzerland) Rappiranhas
9 June	Monte Real Academy (Portugal)	0–4	(Netherlands) Zeeland
10 June	Rappiranhas (Switzerland)	8–1	(Portugal) Monte Real Academy
10 June	Zeeland (Netherlands)	4–3 (a.e.t.)	(Spain) Mazarrón
11 June	Mazarrón (Spain)	8–5	(Portugal) Monte Real Academy
11 June	Zeeland (Netherlands)	3–4	(Switzerland) Rappiranhas

=== Group F ===
Pos	Team	Pld	W	W+	WP	L	GF	GA	GD	Pts
1	Isle of Wight	3	3	0	0	0	17	6	+11	9
2	Cagliari	3	1	1	0	1	19	12	+7	5
3	Brussels	3	1	0	0	2	13	21	−8	3
4	Barriada de la Playa	3	0	0	0	3	9	19	−10	0

Source: BSWW

9 June	Barriada de la Playa (Spain)	3–6	(England) Isle of Wight
9 June	Brussels (Belgium)	7–9 (a.e.t.)	(Italy) Cagliari
10 June	Isle of Wight (England)	8–1	(Belgium) Brussels
10 June	Cagliari (Italy)	8–2	(Spain) Barriada de la Playa
11 June	Barriada de la Playa (Spain)	4–5	(Belgium) Brussels
11 June	Cagliari (Italy)	2–3	(England) Isle of Wight

== Placement matches ==
Matches take place on 12 June.

21st place	Monte Real Academy (Portugal)	4–3	(Georgia (country)) Batumi
19th place	Winti Panthers (Switzerland)	3–0 w/o	(Spain) Barriada de la Playa
17th place	Brussels (Belgium)	6–0	(France) Marseille Minots

== Knockout stage ==
=== Bracket ===
The draw for the round of 16 took place on 11 June.

Round of 16 losers placement
15th place – 13 June; Report
SandGames Figueira	3
Mazarrón	6
13th place – 13 June; Report
Pozoalbense	0
Cagliari	1
11th place – 13 June; Report
O Sótão	9
Nazaré 2022	3
9th place – 13 June; Report
Rappiranhas	1
Recreativo de Huelva	3

Round of 16
12 June; Report
Isle of Wight	5
Nazaré 2022	2
12 June; Report
Red Devils Chojnice	6
Pozoalbense	1
12 June; Report
FAL Cádizfornia	4
Cagliari	2
12 June; Report
Atlético Torroxeño	6
SandGames Figueira	0
12 June; Report
Rappiranhas	1
Marseille BT	2
12 June; Report
O Sótão	2
Zeeland	7
12 June; Report
Higicontrol Melilla	10
Mazarrón	2
12 June; Report
Recreativo de Huelva	1
Pastéis (a.e.t.)	2

Quarterfinals
13 June; Report
Isle of Wight	4
Red Devils Chojnice	3
13 June; Report
FAL Cádizfornia	3
Atlético Torroxeño	6
13 June; Report
Marseille BT	0
Zeeland	3
13 June; Report
Higicontrol Melilla	6
Pastéis	3

Semi-finals
14 June; Report
Isle of Wight	1
Atlético Torroxeño	3
14 June; Report
Zeeland	1
Higicontrol Melilla	3
5th–8th semi-finals
14 June; Report
Red Devils Chojnice	4
FAL Cádizfornia	2
14 June; Report
Marseille BT (a.e.t.)	4
Pastéis	3

Final
15 June; Report
Atlético Torroxeño	0
Higicontrol Melilla	5
3rd place match
15 June; Report
Isle of Wight	3
Zeeland (a.e.t.)	4
5th place match
15 June; Report
Red Devils Chojnice	5
Marseille BT	2
7th place match
15 June; Report
FAL Cádizfornia	0
Pastéis	1

== Final standings ==
Rank	Team	Result
1st place, gold medalist(s)	Higicontrol Melilla	Champions (3rd place)
2nd place, silver medalist(s)	Atlético Torroxeño	Runners-up
3rd place, bronze medalist(s)	Zeeland	Third place
4	Isle of Wight	
5	Red Devils Chojnice	Eliminated in the Quarter-finals
6	Marseille BT	Eliminated in the Quarter-finals
7	Pastéis	Eliminated in the Quarter-finals
8	FAL Cádizfornia	Eliminated in the Quarter-finals
9	Recreativo de Huelva	Eliminated in the Round of 16
10	Rappiranhas	Eliminated in the Round of 16
11	O Sótão	Eliminated in the Round of 16
12	Nazaré 2022	Eliminated in the Round of 16
13	Cagliari	Eliminated in the Round of 16
14	Pozoalbense	Eliminated in the Round of 16
15	Mazarrón	Eliminated in the Round of 16
16	SandGames Figueira	Eliminated in the Round of 16
17	Brussels	Eliminated in the Group Stage
18	Marseille Minots	Eliminated in the Group Stage
19	Winti Panthers	Eliminated in the Group Stage
20	Barriada de la Playa	Eliminated in the Group Stage
21	Monte Real Academy	Eliminated in the Group Stage
22	Batumi	Eliminated in the Group Stage
23	AO Kefallinia	Eliminated in the Group Stage

== See also ==
- Futsal Women's European Champions
