= Alba Mellado =

Spanish footballer

Personal information
- Full name: Alba Mellado Martínez
- Date of birth: 18 March 1992 (age 34)
- Place of birth: Madrid, Spain
- Height: 1.64 m (5 ft 5 in)
- Position: Striker

Team information
- Current team: Levante las planas
- Number: 10

Senior career*
Years	Team	Apps	(Gls)
2009–2012	Rayo Vallecano		
2012–2014	Pozuelo		
2014–2021	Madrid CFF	79	(7)
2021–	Santa Teresa	20	(1)
- * Club domestic league appearances and goals

Alba Mellado (born 18 March 1992) is a Spanish football striker, currently playing for Santa Teresa.

== Football career ==
With Rayo Vallecano, Mellado took part in the 2011–12 Champions League. During her time at Madrid CFF, she was captain on a number of occasions. In addition to playing for Madrid CFF, she also held a coaching role in the children's teams. In August 2020, Mellado agreed to extend her contract at Madrid for a further season, however, she announced her sudden departure from the club in January 2021 having spent seven seasons at the club. That same month, her transfer to Santa Teresa was announced.

== Beach soccer career ==
In beach soccer, Mellado has been called up to the Spain national team to play in the Euro Beach Soccer League. She also represented Madrid CFF in the 2021 Women's Euro Winners Cup. Madrid won the tournament with Mellado scoring four goals in the final and finishing as the tournament's top goalscorer with 14 goals.
