= Anaëlle Wiard =

Belgian football, futsal and beach soccer player

Personal information
- Date of birth: 23 March 1991 (age 35)
- Place of birth: Belgium
- Position: Striker

Team information
- Current team: Fémina White Star Woluwe

Senior career*
Years	Team	Apps	(Gls)
2007–2010	White Star Woluwe		
2010–2017	Anderlecht	69	(23)
2017–2018	Standard Liège	8	(3)
2018–2020	Oud-Heverlee Leuven	36	(9)
2020–2022	Eendracht Aalst	23	(3)
2020–	FP Halle-Gooik (futsal)		
2020–?	New Team Brussels (beach soccer)	6	(7)
2022–2023	Fémina White Star Woluwe	23	(7)
?–	Playas San Javier (beach soccer)		

International career
2011–2016	Belgium	16	(5)
- * Club domestic league appearances and goals as of 08:19, 21 June 2023 (UTC)

Anaëlle Wiard (born 23 March 1991) is a Belgian football, futsal and beach soccer player, who has made 16 appearances for the Belgium women's national football team. At club level, she most recently played football for Fémina White Star Woluwe and beach soccer for Playas San Javier.

== Club career ==
Wiard plays as a striker. She made her debut aged 16 for White Star Woluwe, and played for the club for three years. In 2010, she transferred to Anderlecht. She played in the Anderlecht team that lost the 2016 Belgian Women's Cup Final to Lierse SK; she scored Anderlecht's only goal in the final, as they lost 2–1. In 2017, Wiard was injured in a match against Standard Liège, and was forced to miss the last few matches of the season. In 2018, she signed for Oud-Heverlee Leuven from Standard Liège; she was one of 20 signings that OH Leuven made, and one of five signings from Standard Liège. That year, she scored a hat-trick for OH Leuven in a match against KSK Heist.

In April 2020, Wiard signed for Eendracht Aalst. In July 2020, she signed for Belgian futsal club FP Halle-Gooik. She continued to play football for Eendracht Aalst alongside her futsal role. In September 2020, she played for beach soccer team New Team Brussels in the Beach Soccer Champions League. She had been the team's top scorer in the C1 league. She had taken up the sport in June, and was the tournament's top scorer. Wiard chose to miss Eendracht Aalst football matches to attend the tournament. In November 2020, she sustained a cruciate ligament injury that sidelined her for six months. It was the third cruciate ligament injury of her career. In May 2021, Wiard signed a one-year contract extension with Eendracht Aalst.

Wiard played for Fémina White Star Woluwe in the 2022–23 Belgian Women's Super League. She announced her retirement from football at the end of the season. In beach soccer, she played for Playas San Javier at the 2023 Women's Euro Winners Cup in June 2023. She scored four goals in the quarter final match.

== International career ==
Wiard has made 16 appearances for the Belgium women's national football team, scoring five goals. She was part of the Belgian squad at the 2015 Cyprus Women's Cup.

== Personal life ==
Aside from football, Wiard works as a physical education teacher. She is also a coach of an under-9s boys football team in Watermael-Boitsfort.
