= 2018 Women's Euro Winners Cup =

Tournament details
- Host country: Portugal
- Dates: 28 May – 3 June 2018
- Teams: 20 (from 1 confederation)
- Venues: 3 (in 1 host city)

Final positions
- Champions: WFC Zvezda (1st title)
- Runners-up: Portsmouth Ladies
- Third place: AIS Playas de San Javier
- Fourth place: Amnéville

Tournament statistics
- Matches played: 62
- Goals scored: 417 (6.73 per match)

The 2018 Women's Euro Winners Cup was the third edition of the Women's Euro Winners Cup (WEWC), an annual continental beach soccer tournament for women's top-division European clubs. The championship is the sport's version of the UEFA Women's Champions League in association football.

Organised by Beach Soccer Worldwide (BSWW), the tournament was held in Nazaré, Portugal from 28 May till 3 June 2018, in tandem with the larger men's edition.

The event began with a round robin group stage. At its conclusion, the best teams progressed to the knockout stage, a series of single elimination games to determine the winners, starting with the Round of 16 and ending with the final. Consolation matches were also played to determine other final rankings.

Havana Shots Aargau of Switzerland were the defending champions, but were knocked out in the quarter-finals by WFC Zvezda of Russia, ultimately finishing in 8th place. WFC Zvezda went on to win their first title, beating Portsmouth Ladies of the England in the final, Pompey's second runners-up finish in a row.

== Teams ==
Location of teams in the 2018 Euro Winners Cup main round.
Groups key: A; B; C; D; E.

20 teams entered the tournament – all of whom entered straight into the group stage.

12 different nations were represented.

=== Qualification ===
As per BSWW regulations, qualification for the 2018 WEWC is achieved as follows:

- The reigning champions qualify automatically (Havana Shots Aargau of Switzerland).
- The winners of all European national women's beach soccer leagues/championships are entitled to automatic qualification. (Note that no league champion from Switzerland qualified as this was Havana Shots Aargau who had already qualified as current WEWC champions)
- In countries where women's clubs exist but a national women's league or championship does not yet exist, one club can be nominated to represent that country.
- If a national association wishes to enter more than one club, they can request for permission to do so from the organisers BSWW who will grant or reject the clubs a berth at the tournament depending on the total number of teams already registered.

=== Entrants ===
Key: H: Hosts \ TH: Title holders

Group stage
Sporting CP (H)	AIS Playas de San Javier	DTS Ede	WFC Zvezda
Havana Shots Aargau (TH)	Femenino Cáceres	Amnéville	Beachkick Ladies Berlin
Higicontrol Melilla	Lady Grembach EE Łódź	Grande Motte Pyramide	Nõmme Kalju
Roses Platja	KU AZS UAM Poznan	Lokrians	Portsmouth Ladies
Madrid	HTC Zwolle	Terracina Ladies	Vetlanda United

== Venues ==
Praia de Nazaré (Nazaré Beach) is the host location of the competition for the second year running	Location of Nazaré in Portugal.

Three venues were used in one host city: Nazaré, Leiria District, Portugal.

- Matches took place at Praia de Nazaré (Nazaré Beach) on one of three pitches:
1. The Main pitch, otherwise known as the Estádio do Viveiro (Viveiro Stadium), with a capacity of 1,600.

- Host of 12 matches; all main bracket ties from the quarter-finals onwards and all host club (Sporting CP) matches.

2. Pitch 2, a purpose made pitch, located adjacent to the main stadium.

- Host of 24 matches; all Round of 16 ties and all losers brackets ties from the quarter-finals onwards.

3. Pitch 3, a purpose made pitch, located adjacent to pitch 2.

- Host of 26 matches; only used during the group stage.

== Squads ==
Each club must submit a squad of a maximum of 12 players that includes a minimum of two goalkeepers. Players are to be assigned shirt numbers between 1 and 22 (the number 1 must be reserved for a goalkeeper). Three delegates must accompany the players, including at least one medical personnel. A maximum of three foreign players are allowed to be part of the squad. This was later increased to four, however a maximum of three of these players are permitted to play in a match.

== Draw ==
The draw for the group stage took place on May 9 at 12:00 local time in Nazaré, Portugal at the Biblioteca Municipal de Nazaré (Nazaré Public Library), conducted by the Mayor of Nazaré, Walter Chicharro, PFP Director Pedro Dias, BSWW Deputy Vice-President, Gabino Renales and BSWW Head of Competitions, Josep Ponset.

The BSWW organising committee decided to split the 20 teams into five groups of four, conducting the draw as follows:

Draw procedure
- The clubs were seeded. From every country represented, each club that finished highest in its country's national league were grouped together and ordered based upon the final ranking of the club that represented their national association in the previous edition of the championship. The exception to this was Sporting CP who, as the host club, were automatically given the number 1 seed and assigned to position A1.
- The top four clubs in this order received the next top seeds and were automatically assigned to the groups, with the 2nd seed placed in position B1 through to the 5th seed allocated to E1.
- Out of the remaining 15 clubs, again, from each country still represented, each club that finished highest in its country's national league were grouped together and ordered based upon the 2017 final ranking once more. These clubs in this order received the next top seeds available.
- For the countries still represented by one or more clubs, this process repeated until every club was seeded.
- The 15 teams were split into three pots, with the highest seeds placed into Pot 1 down to the lowest seeds placed in Pot 3 (along with one unseeded club, Nõmme Kalju, as there was no representative club of their association in the last edition to calculate a seed from).
- Each pot consisted of five teams.
- One team from each pot was drawn into each of the groups, A through E, chronologically. The teams from Pot 1 were assigned to position 2, those from Pot 2, assigned to position 3 and those from Pot 3, position 4.
- Teams from the same association could not be drawn into the same group.

Pots
Auto-assigned clubs	Pot 1	Pot 2	Pot 3
(Portugal) Sporting CP (assigned to A1); (Switzerland) Havana Shots Aargau (assigned to B1); (England) Portsmouth Ladies (assigned to C1); (Spain) AIS Playas de San Javier (assigned to D1); (Russia) WFC Zvezda (assigned to E1)	(Spain) Roses Platja; (Germany) Beachkick Ladies Berlin; (Italy) Terracina Ladies; (Poland) Lady Grembach EE Łódź; (Netherlands) HTC Zwolle	(Sweden) Vetlanda United; (France) Amnéville; (Spain) Femenino Cáceres; (Italy) Lokrians; (Poland) KU AZS UAM Poznan	(Netherlands) DTS Ede; (France) Grande Motte Pyramide; (Spain) Higicontrol Melilla; (Spain) Madrid; (Estonia) Nõmme Kalju (unseeded)

== Group stage ==
The group stage fixtures were announced on 16 May.

All times are local, WEST (UTC+1).

=== Group A ===
Pos	Team	Pld	W	W+	WP	L	GF	GA	GD	Pts	Qualification
1	Higicontrol Melilla	3	3	0	0	0	17	8	+9	9	Knockout stage
2	Lady Grembach EE Łódź	3	2	0	0	1	13	10	+3	6	Knockout stage
3	Sporting CP	3	1	0	0	2	9	12	–3	3	Knockout stage
4	Vetlanda United	3	0	0	0	3	4	13	–9	0	

28 May 2018	Lady Grembach EE Łódź (Poland)	5–1	(Sweden) Vetlanda United	Pitch 3
14:00	Kurek 5'; Suskiewicz 20'; Kushiyama 26', 27', 28'	Report(ru)	17' Gustafsson

28 May 2018	Higicontrol Melilla (Spain)	6–3	(Portugal) Sporting CP	Main pitch
17:45	Lorena 3', 22'; Perez 4'; Gomez 15', 29'; Marreiros 18' (o.g.)	Report(ru)	7', 10' M. Rosa; 35' Meza	Referee: Benoit Wolff (France)

29 May 2018	Lady Grembach EE Łódź (Poland)	4–6	(Spain) Higicontrol Melilla	Pitch 3
14:00	Adri 19', 31', 33'; Stodulska 31'	Report(ru)	8' Aixata; 14', 30', 35', 36' Gomez; 31' Soto

29 May 2018	Sporting CP (Portugal)	3–2	(Sweden) Vetlanda United	Main pitch
17:45	M. Rosa 7', 28'; Cruz 19'	Report(ru)	12' Falk; 32' Saari	Referee: Raffaele Delvecchio (San Marino)

30 May 2018	Vetlanda United (Sweden)	1–5	(Spain) Higicontrol Melilla	Pitch 3
14:00	Ivarsson 34'	Report(ru)	2' Lorena; 6', 24' Gomez; 8' Nerea; 15' Perez

30 May 2018	Sporting CP (Portugal)	3–4	(Poland) Lady Grembach EE Łódź	Main pitch
17:45	Marie 23'; Flores 20', 33'	Report(ru)	11' Kurek; 14', 24' Kushiyama; 22' Stodulska	Referee: Malte Gerhardt (Germany)

=== Group B ===
Pos	Team	Pld	W	W+	WP	L	GF	GA	GD	Pts	Qualification
1	Beachkick Ladies Berlin	3	2	0	0	1	9	7	+2	6	Knockout stage
2	Lokrians	3	2	0	0	1	13	13	0	6	Knockout stage
3	Havana Shots Aargau	3	1	0	0	2	8	11	–3	3	Knockout stage
4	Madrid	3	1	0	0	2	9	8	+1	3	Knockout stage

28 May 2018	Beachkick Ladies Berlin (Germany)	4–2	(Italy) Lokrians	Pitch 3
12:45	Schultze 11'; Meyer 13'; Borger 20'; Gabriel 30'	Report(ru)	25', 34' Linza

28 May 2018	Madrid (Spain)	1–2	(Switzerland) Havana Shots Aargau	Pitch 3
19:00	L. Del Rio 10'	Report(ru)	18' Hantz; 18' Birrfelder

29 May 2018	Beachkick Ladies Berlin (Germany)	1–4	(Spain) Madrid	Pitch 3
12:45	Gabriel 12'	Report(ru)	12', 27' Mellado; 33' L. Del Rio; 36' Marina

29 May 2018	Havana Shots Aargau (Switzerland)	5–6	(Italy) Lokrians	Pitch 3
19:00	Genovesi 1', 5', 33'; Pluss 7'; Carmen 34'	Report(ru)	D’amico 7'; Marino 13', 17', 26', 29', 31'

30 May 2018	Lokrians (Italy)	5–4	(Spain) Madrid	Pitch 3
12:45	D’amico 3', 19'; Boutimah 6', 26'; Linza 10'	Report(ru)	3' Garrido; 7' Mellado; 8' Carol; 11' L. Del Rio

30 May 2018	Havana Shots Aargau (Switzerland)	1–4	(Germany) Beachkick Ladies Berlin	Pitch 3
19:00	Genovesi 15'	Report(ru)	30' Gabriel; 30' Meyer; 31' Joswiak; 32' Borger

=== Group C ===
Pos	Team	Pld	W	W+	WP	L	GF	GA	GD	Pts	Qualification
1	Portsmouth Ladies	3	3	0	0	0	34	5	+29	9	Knockout stage
2	HTC Zwolle	3	2	0	0	1	10	10	0	6	Knockout stage
3	Femenino Cáceres	3	1	0	0	2	6	15	–9	3	Knockout stage
4	Nõmme Kalju	3	0	0	0	3	4	24	–20	0	

28 May 2018	HTC Zwolle (Netherlands)	3–1	(Spain) Femenino Cáceres	Pitch 3
11:30	Tip 17'; Van Velsen 35'; Ten Brinke 36'	Report(ru)	23' Chaves

28 May 2018	Nõmme Kalju (Estonia)	1–16	(England) Portsmouth Ladies	Pitch 3
17:45	Praun 22'	Report(ru)	10' Short; 14', 19', 29', 31' Clark; 15', 16', 26', 34' James; 17', 26' Scott; 22', 32', 36' Hillier; 23' Sievwright; 32' Widdowson

29 May 2018	HTC Zwolle (Netherlands)	4–2	(Estonia) Nõmme Kalju	Pitch 3
11:30	De Laat 1', 23'; Van Velsen 3'; Tip 27'	Report(ru)	3', 34' Andre

29 May 2018	Portsmouth Ladies (England)	11–1	(Spain) Femenino Cáceres	Pitch 3
17:45	Hillier 5', 15'; Kempson 8', 10', 24'; Clark 12', 13', 22'; Widdowson 22', 26', 30'	Report(ru)	18' Solano

30 May 2018	Femenino Cáceres (Spain)	4–1	(Estonia) Nõmme Kalju	Pitch 3
11:30	Pajuelo 2'; Hernández 8'; Alegre 21'; Solano 30'	Report(ru)	10' Andre

30 May 2018	Portsmouth Ladies (England)	7–3	(Netherlands) HTC Zwolle	Pitch 3
17:45	Hillier 2', 3', 20'; James 8', 14'; Clark 19', 33'	Report(ru)	2', 33' Ten Brinke; 13' Boerrigter

=== Group D ===
Pos	Team	Pld	W	W+	WP	L	GF	GA	GD	Pts	Qualification
1	AIS Playas de San Javier	3	2	0	0	1	11	7	+4	6	Knockout stage
2	Amnéville	3	2	0	0	1	9	8	+1	6	Knockout stage
3	Terracina Ladies	3	2	0	0	1	11	9	+2	6	Knockout stage
4	DTS Ede	3	0	0	0	3	6	13	–7	0	

28 May 2018	Terracina Ladies (Italy)	2–4	(France) Amnéville	Pitch 3
10:15	Bastos 8', 30'	Report(ru)	13' Corplet; 17' Dautun; 20', 32' Gomes

28 May 2018	DTS Ede (Netherlands)	2–4	(Spain) AIS Playas de San Javier	Pitch 3
16:30	Zech 13'; Blankespoor 28'	Report(ru)	1' Carol Glz; 9' Villar; 28' Miron; 33' Marta

29 May 2018	Terracina Ladies (Italy)	5–2	(Netherlands) DTS Ede	Pitch 3
10:15	Dou 9', 30'; Bastos 24', 27'; Paggiarino 34'	Report(ru)	24' De Bondt; 32' Blankespoor

29 May 2018	AIS Playas de San Javier (Spain)	4–1	(France) Amnéville	Pitch 3
16:30	Karen 8'; Carmen M. 22', 24'; Marta 31'	Report(ru)	34' Gomes

30 May 2018	Amnéville (France)	4–2	(Netherlands) DTS Ede	Pitch 3
10:15	Gomes 8', 22'; Simon 24'; Corplet 25'	Report(ru)	12' Zech; 24' Van Dijk

30 May 2018	AIS Playas de San Javier (Spain)	3–4	(Italy) Terracina Ladies	Pitch 3
16:30	Patricia 29'; Karen 29'; Carol Glz 36'	Report(ru)	14' Altobelli; 26', 36' Colodetti; 27' Maiorca

=== Group E ===
Pos	Team	Pld	W	W+	WP	L	GF	GA	GD	Pts	Qualification
1	WFC Zvezda	3	1	1	1	0	15	9	+6	6	Knockout stage
2	Roses Platja	3	2	0	0	1	12	7	+5	6	Knockout stage
3	KU AZS UAM Poznan	3	1	0	0	2	6	11	–5	3	Knockout stage
4	Grande Motte Pyramide	3	0	0	0	3	7	13	–6	0	

28 May 2018	Grande Motte Pyramide (France)	4–6 (a.e.t.)	(Russia) WFC Zvezda	Pitch 3
15:15	Bouquet 3'; Mula 11'; Sica 18'; Courtial 26'	Report(ru)	15', 38' Osinovskaia; 18' Kanaeva; 19' Zaitseva; 29' Cherniakova; 37' Akylbaeva

28 May 2018	Roses Platja (Spain)	4–2	(Poland) KU AZS UAM Poznan	Pitch 2
19:00	Geral 16'; Ferrer 28', 32'; Morera 32'	Report(ru)	10' Falborska; 36' Lichtenstein

29 May 2018	WFC Zvezda (Russia)	6–2	(Poland) KU AZS UAM Poznan	Pitch 3
09:00	Khutornaia 1'; Gorshkova 9', 16'; Bazhanova 26'; Stakhovskaia 29'; Cherniakova 30'	Report(ru)	16' Puk; 25' Zajac

29 May 2018	Roses Platja (Spain)	5–2	(France) Grande Motte Pyramide	Pitch 3
15:15	Zaira 9'; Morera 16', 36'; Geral 24'; Ferrer 36'	Report(ru)	9' Courtial; 17' Mula

30 May 2018	KU AZS UAM Poznan (Poland)	2–1	(France) Grande Motte Pyramide	Pitch 3
09:00	Falborska 12'; Zajac 24'	Report(ru)	35' Descot

30 May 2018	WFC Zvezda (Russia)	3–3 (a.e.t.) (3–1 p)	(Spain) Roses Platja	Pitch 3
15:15	Cherniakova 8'; Gorshkova 10'; Zaitseva 23'	Report(ru)	13', 33' Pascu; 21' Lidia
	Penalties
	Kanaeva (penalty scored); Osinovskaia (penalty scored); Cherniakova (penalty scored)		(penalty scored) Pascu; (penalty missed) Morera

== Knockout stage ==
The top three clubs from each group, plus the best fourth placed team advance to the Round of 16.

In the knockout stage, the clubs compete in single-elimination matches. Consolation matches are also played to determine the final rankings involving the clubs knocked out of each round of the knockout stage.

- Round of 16 draw:

The Round of 16 draw was conducted on 30 May following the conclusion of the day's matches. The 16 clubs were placed into two pots of eight. The five group winners and the three best runners-up (Lady Grembach EE Łódź, Amnéville & Roses Platja) were placed in Pot 1. The remaining two runners-up, the five third-placed teams and the best fourth-placed club were assigned to Pot 2.

For each Round of 16 tie, a club from Pot 1 was drawn to play against a club from Pot 2. However, clubs who finished 1st and 2nd in the same group could not be drawn against each other. As each tie was drawn, they were allocated chronologically from top to bottom in the bracket below. The draw was conducted by the Mayor of Nazaré, Walter Chicharro and Dario Ramacciotti of Viareggio.

Main bracket

Round of 16
Amnéville	7
KU AZS UAM Poznan	5
Higicontrol Melilla	3 (1)
Femenino Cáceres (p)	3 (3)
Lady Grembach EE Łódź (a.e.t.)	4
Madrid	3
Portsmouth Ladies	4
Terracina Ladies	2
WFC Zvezda	6
HTC Zwolle	2
Beachkick Ladies Berlin	0
Havana Shots Aargau	2
Roses Platja	5
Sporting CP	2
AIS Playas de San Javier	10
Lokrians	1

Quarter-finals
Amnéville	3
Femenino Cáceres	1
Lady Grembach EE Łódź	4 (4)
Portsmouth Ladies (p)	4 (5)
WFC Zvezda	5
Havana Shots Aargau	2
Roses Platja	1
AIS Playas de San Javier	3

Semi-finals
Amnéville	4
Portsmouth Ladies	5
WFC Zvezda	4
AIS Playas de San Javier	2

Final
Portsmouth Ladies	0
WFC Zvezda	2
Third place
Amnéville	1
AIS Playas de San Javier	3

Losers brackets

Round of 16 losers bracket

13th place play-off
Madrid	4
Beachkick Ladies Berlin	5
15th place play-off
KU AZS UAM Poznan	4
Lokrians	5

13th–16th place semi-finals
KU AZS UAM Poznan	1
Madrid	7
Beachkick Ladies Berlin	7
Lokrians	3

9th-16th place quarter-finals
KU AZS UAM Poznan	0
Higicontrol Melilla	5
Madrid	5 (0)
Terracina Ladies (p)	5 (2)
HTC Zwolle	2
Beachkick Ladies Berlin	1
Sporting CP	6
Lokrians	2

9th-12th place semi-finals
Higicontrol Melilla	3
Terracina Ladies	1
HTC Zwolle	2
Sporting CP	3

9th place play-off
Higicontrol Melilla	1
Sporting CP	4
11th place play-off
Terracina Ladies	0
HTC Zwolle	1

Quarter-finals losers bracket

5th–8th place semi-finals
Femenino Cáceres	2
Lady Grembach EE Łódź	5
Havana Shots Aargau	2
Roses Platja	3

5th place play-off
Lady Grembach EE Łódź	6
Roses Platja	2
7th place play-off
Femenino Cáceres	3
Havana Shots Aargau	1

=== Round of 16 ===
31 May 2018
11:30

Amnéville (France)	7–5	(Poland) KU AZS UAM Poznan
Gomes 5', 7', 11', 19', 30'; Simon 13', 15'	Report(ru)	14' Zajac; 21', 32' Falborska; 28' (o.g.) Burtin; 30' Jankowska

Pitch 2
Referee: Attila Balint (Romania)
31 May 2018
12:45

Higicontrol Melilla (Spain)	3–3 (a.e.t.)	(Spain) Femenino Cáceres
Asensio 17'; Soto 22'; Gomez 25'	Report(ru)	13' Alegre; 22' Hernandez; 24' Pajuelo
Penalties
Soto (penalty missed); Asensio (penalty scored)	1–3	(penalty scored) Alegre; (penalty scored) Pajuelo; (penalty scored) Molano

Pitch 2
Referee: Sadagat Valiyeva (Azerbaijan)
31 May 2018
14:00

AIS Playas de San Javier (Spain)	10–1	(Italy) Lokrians
Miron 4', 15'; Carol Glz 11', 27'; Jessi 16'; Marta 20'; Sara Tui 22'; Heba 28'; Patricia 29'; Villar 33'	Report(ru)	4' Marino

Pitch 2
Referee: Richard de Bruijn (Netherlands)
31 May 2018
15:15

Lady Grembach EE Łódź (Poland)	4–3 (a.e.t.)	(Spain) Madrid
Kushiyama 14', 32'; Borowiec 27'; Stodulska 37'	Report(ru)	9', 34' Del Rio; 27' Mellado

Pitch 2
Referee: Alfredo Pavone (Italy)
31 May 2018
16:30

WFC Zvezda (Russia)	6–2	(Netherlands) HTC Zwolle
Gorshkova 3', 10', 28'; Ivashkina 19'; Zaitseva 20'; Cherniakova 31'	Report(ru)	27' Van Velsen; 31' Boerrigter

Pitch 2
Referee: Csaba Baghy (Hungary)
31 May 2018
16:30

Roses Platja (Spain)	5–2	(Portugal) Sporting CP
Ferrer 2', 28'; Chamorro 8'; Morera 27', 27'	Report(ru)	2' Marreiros; 29' Cruz

Main pitch
Referee: Moussa Bounaanaa (France)
31 May 2018
17:45

Portsmouth Ladies (England)	4–2	(Italy) Terracina Ladies
James 5'; Widdowson 20'; Hillier 23'; Clark 35'	Report(ru)	8' Colodetti; 13' Maiorca

Pitch 2
Referee: Malte Gerhardt (Germany)
31 May 2018
19:00

Beachkick Ladies Berlin (Germany)	0–2	(Switzerland) Havana Shots Aargau
	Report(ru)	20' Genovesi; 26' Hantz

Pitch 2
Referee: Yeliz Topaloglu (Turkey)

=== Quarter-finals ===
==== 9th–16th place ====
1 June 2018
09:00

KU AZS UAM Poznan (Poland)	0–5	(Spain) Higicontrol Melilla
	Report(ru)	1' Gomez; 19' Asensio; 34' Soto; 34', 35' Perez

Pitch 2
Referee: Vladimir Tashkov (Bulgaria)
1 June 2018
10:15

Sporting CP (Portugal)	6–2	(Italy) Lokrians
Meza 7', 16', 34'; Brunheira 13'; Alfonso 17'; Flores 24'	Report(ru)	2' Boutimah; 25' Ierardi

Pitch 2
Referee: Benoit Wolff (France)
1 June 2018
11:30

Madrid (Spain)	5–5 (a.e.t.)	(Italy) Terracina Ladies
Ontiveros 9', 34'; C. Fernandez 12'; E. Fernandez 28'; Del Rio 36'	Report(ru)	6' Colodetti; 7' Duo; 10' Naticchioni; 19', 24' Bastos
Penalties
Del Rio (penalty missed); Massanet (penalty missed)	0–2	(penalty scored) Colodetti; (penalty scored) Duo

Pitch 2
Referee: Attila Balint (Romania)
1 June 2018
12:45

HTC Zwolle (Netherlands)	2–1	(Germany) Beachkick Ladies Berlin
Munoz 8'; Van Velsen 21'	Report(ru)	17' Wiegand

Pitch 2
Referee: Emmanuel Vocale (Belgium)

==== 1st–8th place ====
1 June 2018
10:15

Amnéville (France)	3–1	(Spain) Femenino Cáceres
Dautun 3'; Gomes 5'; Noel 26'	Report(ru)	3' Pajuelo

Main pitch
Referee: Sadagat Valiyeva (Azerbaijan)
1 June 2018
12:45

Roses Platja (Spain)	1–3	(Spain) AIS Playas de San Javier
Morera 21'	Report(ru)	13' Miron; 28', 35' Carol Glz

Main pitch
Referee: Csaba Baghy (Hungary)
1 June 2018
15:15

Lady Grembach EE Łódź (Poland)	4–4 (a.e.t.)	(England) Portsmouth Ladies
Adri 13', 34'; Borowiec 32'; Stodulska 39'	Report(ru)	17' Kempson; 22' Hillier; 27' James; 37' Widdowson
Penalties
Vypasniak (penalty missed); Suskiewicz (penalty scored); Adri (penalty scored); Stodulska (penalty scored); Kushiyama (penalty scored); Borowiec (penalty missed)	4–5	(penalty scored) Kempson; (penalty scored) James; (penalty missed) Widdowson; (penalty scored) Hillier; (penalty scored) Short; (penalty scored) Scott

Main pitch
Referee: Richard De Bruijn (Netherlands)
1 June 2018
17:45

WFC Zvezda (Russia)	5–2	(Switzerland) Havana Shots Aargau
Ivashkina 10'; Bazhanova 21', 32'; Osinovskaia 26'; Samorodova 34'	Report(ru)	25' Hantz; 34' Shenk

Main pitch
Referee: Alberto Gomez Lameiro (Spain)

=== Semi-finals ===
==== 13th–16th place ====
2 June 2018
09:00

KU AZS UAM Poznan (Poland)	1–7	(Spain) Madrid
Jedraszyk 18'	Report(ru)	6', 28' Garrido; 13', 31', 32' Fernandez; 15' Mellado; 34' Massanet

Pitch 2
Referee: Francisco Henriques Costa (Portugal)
2 June 2018
10:15

Beachkick Ladies Berlin (Germany)	7–3	(Italy) Lokrians
Maurer 1'; Joswiak 11', 17'; Hillmann 14'; Almasalme 15'; Gabriel 29'; Ierardi 33' (o.g.)	Report(ru)	19' Boutimah; 27' Linza; 28' Losurdo

Pitch 2
Referee: Richard De Bruijn (Netherlands)

==== 9th–12th place ====
2 June 2018
11:30

Higicontrol Melilla (Spain)	3–1	(Italy) Terracina Ladies
Soto 7', 10'; Gomez 30'	Report(ru)	26' Maiorca

Pitch 2
Referee: Nuno Madeira Baptista (Switzerland)
2 June 2018
12:45

HTC Zwolle (Netherlands)	2–3	(Portugal) Sporting CP
Van Velsen 2'; Van Der Flier 7'	Report(ru)	11', 27' Cruz; 25' Meza

Pitch 2
Referee: Malte Gerhardt (Germany)

==== 5th–8th place ====
2 June 2018
14:00

Femenino Cáceres (Spain)	2–5	(Poland) Lady Grembach EE Łódź
Selene Alegre 19', 30'	Report(ru)	15', 24' Adri; 21' Stodulska; 22' Borowiec; 34' Suskiewicz

Pitch 2
Referee: Raffaele Delvecchio (San Marino)
2 June 2018
15:15

Havana Shots Aargau (Switzerland)	2–3	(Spain) Roses Platja
Krysl 6'; Muller 34'	Report(ru)	11' Chamorro; 18', 28' Morera

Pitch 2
Referee: Csaba Baghy (Hungary)

==== 1st–4th place ====
2 June 2018
15:15

Amnéville (France)	4–5	(England) Portsmouth Ladies
Dautun 1'; Gomes 3', 4'; Corplet 19'	Report(ru)	8' Widdowson; 12' Hillier; 27', 36' Clark; 33' Kempson

Main pitch
Referee: Yeliz Topaloglu (Turkey)
2 June 2018
17:45

WFC Zvezda (Russia)	4–2	(Spain) AIS Playas de San Javier
Silina 20'; Bazhanova 22'; Ivashkina 25'; Cherniakova 29'	Report(ru)	7' Sara Tui; 9' Carol Glz

Main pitch
Referee: Moussa Bounaanaa (France)

=== Finals ===
==== 15th place match ====
3 June 2018
09:00

KU AZS UAM Poznan (Poland)	4–5	(Italy) Lokrians
Czudzinska 4', 21'; Zajac 6'; Jedraszyk 27'	Report(ru)	11' Losurdo; 12', 15', 30', 36' Marino

Pitch 2
Attendance: Attila Balint (Romania)

==== 13th place match ====
3 June 2018
10:15

Madrid (Spain)	4–5	(Germany) Beachkick Ladies Berlin
Mellado 6', 6', 20'; Barba 19'	Report(ru)	9', 18' Haack; 18', 31' Wiegand; 35' Hillmann

Pitch 2
Referee: Csaba Baghy (Hungary)

==== 11th place match ====
3 June 2018
11:30

Terracina Ladies (Italy)	0–1	(Netherlands) HTC Zwolle
	Report(ru)	5' Saaltink

Pitch 2
Referee: Raffaele Delvecchio (San Marino)

==== 9th place match ====
3 June 2018
12:45

Higicontrol Melilla (Spain)	1–4	(Portugal) Sporting CP
Gomez 26'	Report(ru)	6' Flores; 16', 36' M. Rosa; 20' Marie

Pitch 2
Referee: Nuno Madeira Baptista (Switzerland)

==== 7th place match ====
3 June 2018
14:00

Femenino Cáceres (Spain)	3–1	(Switzerland) Havana Shots Aargau
Selene Alegre 1'; Marina Lopez 7', 31'	Report(ru)	2' Muller

Pitch 2
Referee: Wilson Enrique Bravo Barre (Ecuador)

==== 5th place match ====
3 June 2018
15:15

Lady Grembach EE Łódź (Poland)	6–2	(Spain) Roses Platja
Chamorro 10' (o.g.); Adri 11', 32'; Weidt 22', 36'; Borowiec 26'	Report(ru)	22' Cruz; 32' Pascu

Pitch 2
Referee: Emmanuel Vocale (Belgium)

==== 3rd place match ====
3 June 2018
15:15

Amnéville (France)	1–3	(Spain) AIS Playas de San Javier
Gomes 7'	Report(ru)	6', 24' Miron; 22' Patricia

Main pitch
Referee: Malte Gerhardt (Germany)

==== Championship final ====
3 June 2018
17:45

Portsmouth Ladies (England)	0–2	(Russia) WFC Zvezda
	Report(ru)	1' Silina; 22' Osinovskaia

Main pitch
Referee: Yeliz Topaloglu (Turkey)

== Awards ==
The following individual awards were presented after the final.

Top scorer
(France) Melissa Gomes ( (France) Amnéville)
14 goals
Best player
(England) Molly Clark ( (England) Portsmouth Ladies)
Best goalkeeper
(Russia) Viktoriia Silina ( (Russia) WFC Zvezda)

== Top goalscorers ==
Players who scored at least 5 goals

14 goals

- (Portugal) Melissa Gomes ( (France) Amnéville)

12 goals

- (England) Molly Clark ( (England) Portsmouth Ladies)
- (Spain) Natalia de Francisco Gomez ( (Spain) Higicontrol Melilla)

11 goals

- (England) Gemma Hillier ( (England) Portsmouth Ladies)

10 goals

- (Italy) Federica Marino ( (Italy) Lokrians)

9 goals

- (Brazil) Adri ( (Poland) Lady Grembach EE Łódź)

8 goals

- (England) Katie James ( (England) Portsmouth Ladies)
- (Spain) Alba Mellado ( (Spain) Madrid)
- (Spain) Carla Morera ( (Spain) Roses Platja)

7 goals

- (Japan) Saki Kushiyama ( (Poland) Lady Grembach EE Łódź)
- (England) Jade Widdowson ( (England) Portsmouth Ladies)
- (Spain) Carolina González ( (Spain) AIS Playas de San Javier)

6 goals

- (Portugal) Mariana Rosa ( (Portugal) Sporting CP)
- (Brazil) Noele Bastos ( (Italy) Terracina Ladies)
- (Spain) Laura Del Río ( (Spain) Madrid)
- (Russia) Anastasiia Gorshkova ( (Russia) WFC Zvezda)
- (Spain) Andrea Miron ( (Spain) AIS Playas de San Javier)
- (Russia) Anna Cherniakova ( (Russia) WFC Zvezda)

5 goals

- (Switzerland) Sandra Genovesi ( (Switzerland) Havana Shots Aargau)
- (England) Sarah Kempson ( (England) Portsmouth Ladies)
- (United States) Louisa Meza ( (Portugal) Sporting CP)
- (Spain) Lorena Asensio ( (Spain) Higicontrol Melilla)
- (Spain) Maria Soto ( (Spain) Higicontrol Melilla)
- (Poland) Marta Stodulska ( (Poland) Lady Grembach EE Łódź)
- (Spain) Silvia Ferrer ( (Spain) Roses Platja)
- (Spain) Selene Alegre ( (Spain) Femenino Cáceres)
- (Netherlands) Celine van Velsen ( (Netherlands) HTC Zwolle)

== Final standings ==
Rank	Team	Result
1	WFC Zvezda	Champions (1st title)
2	Portsmouth Ladies	Runners-up
3	AIS Playas de San Javier	Third place
4	Amnéville	
5	Lady Grembach EE Łódź	
6	Roses Platja	
7	Femenino Cáceres	
8	Havana Shots Aargau	
9	Sporting CP	
10	Higicontrol Melilla	
11	HTC Zwolle	
12	Terracina Ladies	
13	Beachkick Ladies Berlin	
14	Madrid	
15	Lokrians	
16	KU AZS UAM Poznan	

== See also ==
- 2018 Euro Winners Cup (men's edition)
