= 2020 Women's Euro Winners Cup =

Tournament details
- Host country: Portugal
- Dates: 9–13 September
- Teams: 5 (from 1 confederation)
- Venues: 2 (in 1 host city)

Final positions
- Champions: Mriya 2006 (1st title)
- Runners-up: Cáceres
- Third place: Zvezda
- Fourth place: Marseille

Tournament statistics
- Matches played: 10
- Goals scored: 61 (6.1 per match)
- Top scorer: Annaelle Wiard (6 goals)
- Best player: María Herrero
- Best goalkeeper: Anna Akylbaeva

The 2020 Women's Euro Winners Cup was the fifth edition of the Women's Euro Winners Cup (WEWC), an annual continental beach soccer tournament for women's top-division European clubs. The championship is the sport's version of the UEFA Women's Champions League in association football.

Organised by Beach Soccer Worldwide (BSWW), the tournament was held in Nazaré, Portugal, in tandem with the larger men's edition.

The competition was supposed to take place from late May to early June. However, on 1 May, all BSWW tournaments were suspended until September because of safety concerns surrounding the COVID-19 pandemic. BSWW rescheduled the competition for 9–13 September. However, due to persisting travel restrictions and health worries deterring clubs from travelling, the pandemic caused the competition to happen on a much smaller scale than previous years, with just five clubs entering.

The competition was played in a round robin format, involving one group of all five teams. At its conclusion, the team with the most points was crowned champions.

AIS Playas de San Javier of Spain were the defending champions, but chose not to enter because of the COVID-19 pandemic. Ukrainian side Mriya 2006 won the competition on their debut, finishing ahead of Cáceres based on their head-to-head result after both clubs finished with the same points.

== Teams ==
=== Qualification ===
Initially, entry requirements for the tournament were the same as last year. To enter, a club needed to be the champions of their country's most recent national championship.

But due to the effect of the COVID-19 pandemic on the competition, many eligible clubs were unable or unwilling to participate due to travel restrictions and quarantine measures upon their repatriation.

Thus, the original rules regarding qualification were subsequently abandoned. Entry restrictions were relaxed: the event was opened up to simply any European club that wished to participate.

=== Entrants ===
Five clubs from five different nations entered the event:

- (Spain) Cáceres
- (France) Marseille
- (Ukraine) Mriya 2006
- (Belgium) Newteam Brussels
- (Russia) Zvezda

== Venues ==
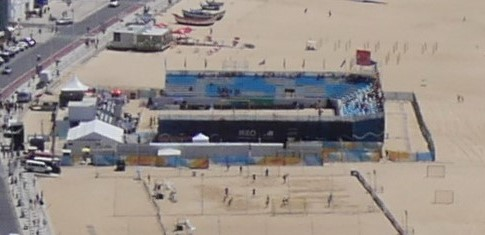
The main Estádio do Viveiro and external Pitch 2 seen below are the venues.

Two venues were used in one host city: Nazaré, Leiria District, Portugal.

Matches took place at Praia de Nazaré (Nazaré Beach) on one of two pitches. The Estádio do Viveiro (Viveiro Stadium) and an external purpose made pitch, located adjacent to the main stadium, simply known as Pitch 2.

== Squads ==
Each club could submit a squad consisting of a maximum of 12 players. A maximum of four foreign players were allowed to be part of the squad, however only three of the four could be outfield players; if a fourth foreign player was to be rostered they must be a goalkeeper.

== Results ==
All times are local, WEST (UTC+1).

Pos	Team	Pld	W	W+	WP	L	GF	GA	GD	Pts	Result
1	Mriya 2006	4	3	0	0	1	15	9	+6	9	Champions (1st title)
2	Cáceres	4	3	0	0	1	12	10	+2	9	Runners-up
3	Zvezda	4	2	0	1	1	17	3	+14	7	Third place
4	Marseille	4	1	0	0	3	8	15	−7	3	
5	Newteam Brussels	4	0	0	0	4	9	24	−15	0	

Source: beachsoccer.com
9 September 2020
14:00

Cáceres (Spain)	2–1	(France) Marseille
Nerea Sánchez 9'; Herrero 19'	Report(ru)	28' Pradier

Estádio do Viveiro
Referee: Annett Unterbeck (Germany)
9 September 2020
14:00

Mriya 2006 (Ukraine)	4–3	(Belgium) Newteam Brussels
Vypasniak 3'; Babenko 20', 36'; Alves 22'	Report(ru)	10' Ribeiro; 12', 36' Wiard

Pitch 2

10 September 2020
14:00

Cáceres (Spain)	8–5	(Belgium) Newteam Brussels
Barquero 6'; Becerra 7'; Herrero 11', 21', 31'; López 23'; Hernández 27'; Garcia 31'	Report(ru)	15' Meza; 20' Moreaux; 21', 26', 34' Wiard

Estádio do Viveiro
Referee: Torsten Guenther (Germany)

11 September 2020
14:00

Zvezda (Russia)	2–2 (a.e.t.)	(Ukraine) Mriya 2006
Cherniakova 18', 36'	Report(ru)	26' Yeromenko; 34' Tykhonova
Penalties
Kanaeva (penalty missed); Khutornaia (penalty scored); Cherniakova (penalty scored)	2–1	(penalty scored) Vypasniak; (penalty missed) Babenko; (penalty missed) Dekhtiar

Estádio do Viveiro
Referee: Annett Unterbeck (Germany)
11 September 2020
15:30

Marseille (France)	4–1	(Belgium) Newteam Brussels
Damache 3'; Pradier 15', 36'; Garcia 15'	Report(ru)	26' Wiard

Pitch 2
Referee: Gionni Matticoli (Italy)

12 September 2020
08:00

Zvezda (Russia)	7–0	(France) Marseille
Kanaeva 1', 29', 30'; Cherniakova 4', 22'; Alekseeva 24'; Zaitseva 32'	Report(ru)

Estádio do Viveiro
Referee: Attila Balint (Romania)
12 September 2020
12:30

Cáceres (Spain)	1–4	(Ukraine) Mriya 2006
Becerra 29'	Report(ru)	26' (pen.) Tykhonova; 29' Kostiuk; 29', 30' Davydenko

Estádio do Viveiro
Referee: Gionni Matticoli (Italy)
12 September 2020
14:00

Newteam Brussels (Belgium)	0–8	(Russia) Zvezda
	Report(ru)	11' Akylbaeva; 20' Zubilova; 21', 22', 35' Bazhanova; 26', 36' Kanaeva; 30' Cherniakova

Pitch 2

13 September 2020
12:00

Marseille (France)	3–5	(Ukraine) Mriya 2006
Pradier 3' (pen.); Garcia 14'; Damache 35'	Report(ru)	8' Kostiuk; 12', 24', 26' Tykhonova; 28' Davydenko

Pitch 2
13 September 2020
16:30

Zvezda (Russia)	0–1	(Spain) Cáceres
	Report(ru)	9' Herrero

Estádio do Viveiro
Referee: Fiametta Susanna (Italy)

== Awards ==
The following individual awards were presented after the final.

Top scorer(s)
(Belgium) Annaelle Wiard ( (Belgium) Newteam Brussels)
6 goals
Best player
(Spain) María Herrero ( Cáceres)
Best goalkeeper
(Russia) Anna Akylbaeva ( Zvezda)

== Top goalscorers ==
Players who scored multiple goals

6 goals

- (Belgium) Annaelle Wiard ( (Belgium) Newteam Brussels)

5 goals

- (Russia) Anna Cherniakova ( (Russia) Zvezda)
- (Ukraine) Mariia Tykhonova ( (Ukraine) Mriya 2006)
- (Russia) Natalia Kanaeva ( (Russia) Zvezda)
- (Spain) María Herrero ( (Spain) Cáceres)

4 goals

- (France) Tiphanie Pradier ( (France) Marseille)

3 goals

- (Ukraine) Ania Davydenko ( (Ukraine) Mriya 2006)
- (Russia) Glafira Bazhanova ( (Russia) Zvezda)

2 goals

- (Ukraine) Yuliia Kostiuk ( (Ukraine) Mriya 2006)
- (Ukraine) Taisiia Babenko ( (Ukraine) Mriya 2006)
- (Switzerland) Sara Garcia ( (France) Marseille)
- (Spain) Maria Becerra ( (Spain) Cáceres)
- (France) Yanma Damache ( (France) Marseille)

== See also ==
- 2020 Euro Winners Cup
