= 2020 Euro Winners Cup =

Tournament details
- Host country: Portugal
- Dates: 8–13 September
- Teams: 27 (from 1 confederation)
- Venues: 2 (in 1 host city)

Final positions
- Champions: (Russia) Kristall (3rd title)
- Runners-up: (Portugal) Braga
- Third place: (Germany) Real Münster
- Fourth place: (Spain) Marbella

Tournament statistics
- Matches played: 71
- Goals scored: 659 (9.28 per match)
- Top scorer: (Spain) Llorenç Gómez (22 goals)
- Best player: (Brazil) Mauricinho
- Best goalkeeper: (Brazil) Rafa Padilha

The 2020 Euro Winners Cup was the eighth edition of the Euro Winners Cup (EWC), an annual continental beach soccer tournament for men's top-division European clubs. The championship is the sport's version of the better known UEFA Champions League in association football.

Organised by Beach Soccer Worldwide (BSWW), the tournament was held in Nazaré, Portugal.

The competition was supposed to take place from 29 May to 7 June. However, on 1 May, all BSWW tournaments were suspended until September because of safety concerns surrounding the COVID-19 pandemic. BSWW rescheduled the competition for 8–13 September. However, due to persisting travel restrictions and health worries deterring clubs from travelling, the pandemic caused the competition to happen on a smaller scale than in previous years.

The competition began with a round robin group stage. At its conclusion, the best teams progressed to the knockout stage, a series of single elimination games to determine the winners, starting with the round of 16 and ending with the final. Classification matches were also played to determine other final rankings.

Braga of Portugal were the three-time defending champions, but lost on penalties in the final to Kristall of Russia who won their third title.

== Teams ==
=== Qualification ===
Initially, entry requirements were as last year. To enter automatically, a club needed to be the champions of their country's most recent national championship (and for Europe's strongest leagues, the runners-up and third placed clubs could also enter). Any club that didn't meet these requirement was entitled to enter the accompanying Euro Winners Challenge (preliminary round) to take place in the days prior to the competition proper, as a last opportunity to qualify for the EWC main round.

But due to the effect of the COVID-19 pandemic on the competition, many eligible clubs were unable or unwilling to participate due to travel restrictions and quarantine measures upon their repatriation.

Thus, the original rules regarding qualification were subsequently abandoned:

- The Euro Winners Challenge (preliminary round) was cancelled.
- Entry restrictions were relaxed: the event was opened up to simply any European club that wished to participate.

=== Entrants ===
27 clubs from 13 different nations entered the event.

Key: H: Hosts \ TH: Title holders

Group stage
Braga (TH)	Kristall	Beach Royals Düsseldorf	Grasshoppers
ACD O Sótão (H)	Krylia Sovetov	Real Münster	Djoker Chişinău
ACD O Sótão Norte	Marbella	Rostocker Robben	Olimpia-Stels
CB Loures	Torrejón	Napoli Patron	West Deva
GRAP	Artur Music	CFS Cartel	Portsmouth
Os Nazarenos	Molniya	Newteam Brussels	Bemannia Stockholm
Sporting CP	Vybir	Marseille	

== Venues ==
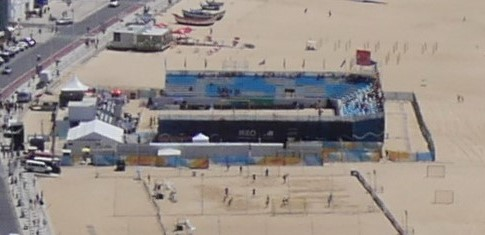
The main Estádio do Viveiro and external Pitch 2 seen below are the venues.

Two venues were used in one host city: Nazaré, Leiria District, Portugal.

Matches took place at Praia de Nazaré (Nazaré Beach) on one of two pitches. The Estádio do Viveiro (Viveiro Stadium) and an external purpose made pitch, located adjacent to the main stadium, simply known as Pitch 2.

== Squads ==
Each club could submit a squad consisting of a maximum of 12 players. A maximum of four foreign players were allowed to be part of the squad, however only three of the four could be outfield players; if a fourth foreign player was to be rostered they must be a goalkeeper.

== Draw ==
The draw to split the 27 clubs into six groups of four and one of three took place at 11:00 WEST (UTC+1) on 5 September in Nazaré, Portugal. The draw was conducted by the Mayor of Nazaré, Walter Chicharro and Portuguese beach soccer player, Madjer. The draw was closed to club representatives due to COVID-19 safety measures.

Seven clubs were seeded and automatically assigned to position one of each group: the host club, the reigning champions and the highest ranked club from the most recent national championship of each country ranked in the top five strongest European leagues, as per the BSWW League ranking (Portugal, Russia, Spain, Ukraine, Germany). The remaining 20 clubs were split into three pots, based on a combination their club ranking and the slot allocation for each country. One club from each pot was drawn into each group.

Two clubs from the same country could not be placed into the same group, save for Portuguese clubs (eight teams but only seven groups), however the two Sótão clubs must be kept separate.

Pots
Seeds	Pot 1	Pot 2	Pot 3
(Portugal) ACD O Sótão (assigned to A1); (Portugal) Braga (assigned to B1); (Portugal) Sporting CP (assigned to C1); (Russia) Kristall (assigned to D1); (Spain) Marbella (assigned to E1); (Ukraine) Vybir (assigned to F1); (Germany) Rostocker Robben (assigned to G1)	(Ukraine) Artur Music; (Russia) Krylia Sovetov; (Greece) Napoli Patron; (Belgium) Newteam Brussels; (Portugal) CB Loures; (Moldova) Djoker Chişinău; (Romania) West Deva	(Portugal) GRAP; (France) Marseille; (England) Portsmouth; (Switzerland) Grasshoppers; (Ukraine) Molniya; (Germany) Beach Royals Düsseldorf; (Sweden) Bemannia Stockholm	(Portugal) Os Nazarenos; (Portugal) ACD O Sótão Norte; (Spain) Torrejón; (Germany) Real Münster; (Belgium) CFS Cartel; (Moldova) Olimpia-Stels

== Group stage ==
All times are local, WEST (UTC+1).

The top two teams from each group, and the best two third places teams, advance to the round of 16.

=== Group A ===
Pos	Team	Pld	W	W+	WP	L	GF	GA	GD	Pts	Qualification
1	ACD O Sotão	2	2	0	0	0	11	4	+7	6	Advance to knockout stage
2	Newteam Brussels	2	1	0	0	1	9	11	−2	3	Advance to knockout stage
3	Marseille	2	0	0	0	2	4	9	−5	0	Advance to knockout stage

Source: beachsoccer.com

8 September 2020	Marseille (France)	1–3	(Portugal) ACD O Sotão	Estádio do Viveiro
18:00	Dionizio 7'	Report(ru)	20' Vidinha; 27', 35' Chiky	Referee: Emmanuel Vocale (Belgium)

9 September 2020	Newteam Brussels (Belgium)	6–3	(France) Marseille	Estádio do Viveiro
18:30	Lapouge 1'; Salem 21', 26', 27'; Ennya 22'; La Grange 26'	Report(ru)	6' Huck; 9' (pen.) Mansoibou; 26' Basquaise	Referee: Fiametta Susanna (Italy)

10 September 2020	ACD O Sotão (Portugal)	8–3	(Belgium) Newteam Brussels	Estádio do Viveiro
18:30		Report(ru)		Referee: Torsten Guenther (Germany)

=== Group B ===
Pos	Team	Pld	W	W+	WP	L	GF	GA	GD	Pts	Qualification
1	Braga	3	3	0	0	0	33	3	+30	9	Advance to knockout stage
2	Artur Music	3	2	0	0	1	30	13	+17	6	Advance to knockout stage
3	CFS Cartel	3	1	0	0	2	5	33	−28	3	
4	Portsmouth	3	0	0	0	3	3	22	−19	0	

Source: beachsoccer.com

8 September 2020	CFS Cartel (Belgium)	0–14	(Portugal) Braga	Estádio do Viveiro
16:30		Report(ru)	3', 14', 15', 29', 29', 36' Filipe da Silva; 7' Bê Martins; 17', 18', 23' Miguel P. 17', 27', 32' Fábio Costa; 25' Torres	Referee: Fiametta Susanna (Italy)

8 September 2020	Artur Music (Ukraine)	8–3	(England) Portsmouth	Pitch 2
16:30		Report(ru)		Referee: Sergio Soares (Portugal)

9 September 2020	Braga (Portugal)	12–0	(England) Portsmouth	Estádio do Viveiro
17:00	Fábio Costa 1', 4'; Miguel P. 2'; Léo Martins 5', 27'; Bê Martins 10' (pen.); Bokinha 19'; Jordan Oliveira 21', 36'; Jordan 26'; Filipe da Silva 28', 34'	Report(ru)		Referee: Torsten Guenther (Germany)

9 September 2020	Artur Music (Ukraine)	19–3	(Belgium) CFS Cartel	Pitch 2
17:00		Report(ru)		Referee: Gionni Matticoli (Italy)

10 September 2020	Braga (Portugal)	7–3	(Ukraine) Artur Music	Estádio do Viveiro
17:00	Bê Martins 2'; Léo Martins 10'; Filipe da Silva 24', 24', 24', 29'; Jordan 26'	Report(ru)	13' Pachev; 16' Llorenç; 32' Voitenko	Referee: Saverio Bottalico (Italy)

10 September 2020	Portsmouth (England)	0–2	(Belgium) CFS Cartel	Pitch 2
17:00		Report(ru)	17', 28'	Referee: Sergio Soares (Portugal)

=== Group C ===
Pos	Team	Pld	W	W+	WP	L	GF	GA	GD	Pts	Qualification
1	Sporting CP	3	2	1	0	0	19	10	+9	8	Advance to knockout stage
2	Napoli Patron	3	1	1	0	1	16	18	−2	5	Advance to knockout stage
3	Beach Royals Düsseldorf	3	1	0	0	2	17	18	−1	3	Advance to knockout stage
4	Torrejón	3	0	0	0	3	11	17	−6	0	

Source: beachsoccer.com

8 September 2020	Torrejón (Spain)	2–5	(Portugal) Sporting CP	Estádio do Viveiro
15:00	Solei 23'; Marques 33'	Report(ru)	10' Petrony; 12' Joaozinho; 18', 28' Seixes; 27' Von	Referee: Saverio Bottalico (Italy)

8 September 2020	Napoli Patron (Greece)	7–6 (a.e.t.)	(Germany) Beach Royals Düsseldorf	Pitch 2
15:00		Report(ru)

9 September 2020	Sporting CP (Portugal)	6–5 (a.e.t.)	(Germany) Beach Royals Düsseldorf	Estádio do Viveiro
15:30		Report(ru)

9 September 2020	Napoli Patron (Greece)	6–4	(Spain) Torrejón	Pitch 2
15:30		Report(ru)

10 September 2020	Sporting CP (Portugal)	8–3	(Greece) Napoli Patron	Estádio do Viveiro
15:30		Report(ru)		Referee: Emmanuel Vocale (Belgium)

10 September 2020	Beach Royals Düsseldorf (Germany)	6–5	(Spain) Torrejón	Pitch 2
15:30		Report(ru)

=== Group D ===
Pos	Team	Pld	W	W+	WP	L	GF	GA	GD	Pts	Qualification
1	Kristall	2	2	0	0	0	16	2	+14	6	Advance to knockout stage
2	Grasshoppers	2	1	0	0	1	13	9	+4	3	Advance to knockout stage
3	Olimpia-Stels	2	0	0	0	2	3	21	−18	0	
4	CB Loures	0	0	0	0	0	0	0	0	0	Disqualified (Note: CB Loures were disqualified based on health and safety grounds after one of their players tested positive for COVID-19.)

Source: beachsoccer.com
Notes:

8 September 2020	Olimpia-Stels (Moldova)	1–9	(Russia) Kristall	Estádio do Viveiro
13:30	Cernenchi 32'	Report(ru)	1', 25' Rodrigo; 2' Datinha; 6' Krasheninnikov; 14' Paporotnyi; 19' Mauricinho; 22' Shishin; 28' Krasnoshchekov; 31' Zharikov	Referee: Gionni Matticoli (Italy)

8 September 2020	CB Loures (Portugal)	cancelled	(Switzerland) Grasshoppers	Pitch 2
13:30

9 September 2020	Kristall (Russia)	7–1	(Switzerland) Grasshoppers	Estádio do Viveiro
12:30		Report(ru)		Referee: Sergio Soares (Portugal)

9 September 2020	CB Loures (Portugal)	cancelled	(Moldova) Olimpia-Stels	Pitch 2
12:30

10 September 2020	Grasshoppers (Switzerland)	12–2	(Moldova) Olimpia-Stels	Pitch 2
12:30		Report(ru)

10 September 2020	Kristall (Russia)	cancelled	(Portugal) CB Loures	Estádio do Viveiro
14:00

=== Group E ===
Pos	Team	Pld	W	W+	WP	L	GF	GA	GD	Pts	Qualification
1	Marbella	3	3	0	0	0	18	6	+12	9	Advance to knockout stage
2	Os Nazarenos	3	2	0	0	1	10	13	−3	6	Advance to knockout stage
3	Bemannia Stockholm	3	0	1	0	2	13	17	−4	2	
4	West Deva	3	0	0	0	3	9	14	−5	0	

Source: beachsoccer.com

8 September 2020	Os Nazarenos (Portugal)	1–8	(Spain) Marbella	Estádio do Viveiro
12:00		Report(ru)		Referee: Csaba Baghy (Hungary)

8 September 2020	West Deva (Romania)	5–7 (a.e.t.)	(Sweden) Bemannia Stockholm	Pitch 2
12:00		Report(ru)		Referee: Sergio Soares (Portugal)

9 September 2020	Marbella (Spain)	6–2	(Sweden) Bemannia Stockholm	Estádio do Viveiro
11:00		Report(ru)		Referee: Antonio Pereira (Portugal)

9 September 2020	West Deva (Romania)	1–3	(Portugal) Os Nazarenos	Pitch 2
11:00	Robles 20'	Report(ru)	6' Marques; 18' Elias; 34' Duarte Hilário	Referee: Saverio Bottalico (Italy)

10 September 2020	Bemannia Stockholm (Sweden)	4–6	(Portugal) Os Nazarenos	Pitch 2
11:00		Report(ru)

10 September 2020	Marbella (Spain)	4–3	(Romania) West Deva	Estádio do Viveiro
12:30		Report(ru)		Referee: Francisco Costa (Portugal)

=== Group F ===
Pos	Team	Pld	W	W+	WP	L	GF	GA	GD	Pts	Qualification
1	Real Münster	3	3	0	0	0	24	7	+17	9	Advance to knockout stage
2	Krylia Sovetov	3	2	0	0	1	15	7	+8	6	Advance to knockout stage
3	GRAP	3	1	0	0	2	11	17	−6	3	
4	Vybir	3	0	0	0	3	5	24	−19	0	

Source: beachsoccer.com

8 September 2020	Real Münster (Germany)	13–1	(Ukraine) Vybir	Estádio do Viveiro
10:30		Report(ru)

8 September 2020	Krylia Sovetov (Russia)	6–3	(Portugal) GRAP	Pitch 2
10:30	Bryshtel 4', 36'; Pinyaev 8'; Duarte 21'; Mikhailov 24'; Lucas 33'	Report(ru)	12' Oliveira; 15', 33' Matos	Referee: Emmanuel Vocale (Belgium)

9 September 2020	Vybir (Ukraine)	4–5	(Portugal) GRAP	Estádio do Viveiro
09:30		Report(ru)

9 September 2020	Krylia Sovetov (Russia)	3–4	(Germany) Real Münster	Pitch 2
09:30		Report(ru)

10 September 2020	GRAP (Portugal)	3–7	(Germany) Real Münster	Pitch 2
09:30		Report(ru)		Referee: Gionni Matticoli (Italy)

10 September 2020	Vybir (Ukraine)	0–6	(Russia) Krylia Sovetov	Estádio do Viveiro
11:00		Report(ru)	5' Dolgopolov; 8', 23' Bryshtel; 8' Duarte; 26', 26' Lucas

=== Group G ===
Pos	Team	Pld	W	W+	WP	L	GF	GA	GD	Pts	Qualification
1	Molniya	3	2	0	1	0	14	7	+7	7	Advance to knockout stage
2	Rostocker Robben	3	2	0	0	1	19	13	+6	6	Advance to knockout stage
3	Djoker Chişinău	3	1	0	0	2	12	13	−1	3	
4	ACD O Sótão Norte	3	0	0	0	3	13	25	−12	0	

Source: beachsoccer.com

8 September 2020	ACD O Sótão Norte (Portugal)	6–12	(Germany) Rostocker Robben	Estádio do Viveiro
09:00		Report(ru)

8 September 2020	Djoker Chişinău (Moldova)	1–5	(Ukraine) Molniya	Pitch 2
09:00	Timbalist 20'	Report(ru)	10', 30' Eduard; 14' Rarot; 17' Kasatkin; 26' Antonio

9 September 2020	Djoker Chişinău (Moldova)	8–2	(Portugal) ACD O Sótão Norte	Pitch 2
08:00		Report(ru)

9 September 2020	Rostocker Robben (Germany)	1–4	(Ukraine) Molniya	Estádio do Viveiro
08:00	Dorph 33'	Report(ru)	1', 4' Eduard; 36' Antonio; 36' Lotariev	Referee: Sergio Soares (Portugal)

10 September 2020	Rostocker Robben (Germany)	6–3	(Moldova) Djoker Chişinău	Estádio do Viveiro
08:00		Report(ru)		Referee: Antonio Pereira (Portugal)

10 September 2020	Molniya (Ukraine)	5–5 (a.e.t.) (2–1 p)	(Portugal) ACD O Sótão Norte	Estádio do Viveiro
09:30		Report(ru)		Referee: Fiametta Susanna (Italy)

=== Ranking of third placed teams ===
The first, the second and the two best third placed teams advanced to knockout stage. Since groups A and D consisted of three teams, for the three first placed teams from the other groups (B, C, E, F, G), their results against the teams finishing in fourth place in their group were discounted for this ranking.

Pos	Grp	Team	Pld	W	W+	WP	L	GF	GA	GD	Pts	Qualification
1	C	Beach Royals Düsseldorf	2	0	0	0	2	11	13	−2	0	Advance to knockout stage
2	A	Marseille	2	0	0	0	2	4	9	−5	0	Advance to knockout stage
3	E	Bemannia Stockholm	2	0	0	0	2	6	12	−6	0	
4	F	GRAP	2	0	0	0	2	6	13	−7	0	
5	G	Djoker Chişinău	2	0	0	0	2	4	11	−7	0	
6	D	Olimpia-Stels	2	0	0	0	2	3	21	−18	0	
7	B	CFS Cartel	2	0	0	0	2	3	33	−30	0	

Source: beachsoccer.com

== Knockout stage ==
=== Draw ===
The draw to determine the round of 16 ties and composition of the knockout stage bracket took place on 10 September after the conclusion of all group stage matches. It was conducted by the Mayor of Nazaré, Walter Chicharro, and Yuliia Dekhtiar, captain of Myria 2006, partaking in the women's tournament.

The 16 clubs were split into four pots of four based on their performance in the group stage, with the best performing clubs placed in Pot 1 down to the worst performing quartet in Pot 4:

Teams from Pot 1 were drawn against teams from Pot 4; teams from Pot 2 were drawn against teams from Pot 3. The drawing of ties alternated as such and were allocated to the bracket from top to bottom in the order they were drawn. However, teams that partook in the same group during the group stage could not be drawn against each other.

Pot 1	Pot 2	Pot 3	Pot 4
(Portugal) Braga; (Russia) Kristall; (Spain) Marbella; (Portugal) ACD O Sótão	(Ukraine) Molniya; (Germany) Real Münster; (Portugal) Sporting CP; (Ukraine) Artur Music	(Switzerland) Grasshoppers; (Russia) Krylia Sovetov; (Germany) Rostocker Robben; (Belgium) Newteam Brussels	(Portugal) Os Nazarenos; (Greece) Napoli Patron; (Germany) Beach Royals Düsseldorf; (France) Marseille

=== Bracket ===
Ninth place
(Switzerland) Grasshoppers	3
(Portugal) Sporting CP	5
Eleventh place
(Germany) Rostocker Robben	6
(Portugal) Os Nazarenos (a.e.t.)	8
Thirteenth place
(France) Marseille	4
(Germany) BR Düsseldorf	6
Fifteenth place
(Greece) Napoli Patron	0
(Belgium) Newteam Brussels	3

Consolation semifinals
(Germany) Rostocker Robben	2
(Switzerland) Grasshoppers	3
(Portugal) Sporting CP	5
(Portugal) Os Nazarenos	1
13th–16th classification
(Greece) Napoli Patron	3
(France) Marseille	5
(Germany) BR Düsseldorf	7
(Belgium) Newteam Brussels	2

Consolation quarterfinals
(Greece) Napoli Patron	3
(Germany) Rostocker Robben	6
(France) Marseille	3
(Switzerland) Grasshoppers	6
(Germany) BR Düsseldorf	0
(Portugal) Sporting CP	5
(Portugal) Os Nazarenos (p)	6(2)
(Belgium) Newteam Brussels	6(1)

Round of 16
(Spain) Marbella	9
(Greece) Napoli Patron	6
(Ukraine) Artur Music	8
(Germany) Rostocker Robben	1
(Russia) Kristall	7
(France) Marseille	1
(Ukraine) Molniya	6
(Switzerland) Grasshoppers	4
(Portugal) Braga	9
(Germany) BR Düsseldorf	1
(Portugal) Sporting CP	3
(Russia) Krylia Sovetov	6
(Portugal) ACD O Sotão	4
(Portugal) Os Nazarenos	2
(Germany) Real Münster	9
(Belgium) Newteam Brussels	3

Quarterfinals
(Spain) Marbella (p)	7(3)
(Ukraine) Artur Music	7(1)
(Russia) Kristall	13
(Ukraine) Molniya	3
(Portugal) Braga	6
(Russia) Krylia Sovetov	0
(Portugal) ACD O Sotão	2
(Germany) Real Münster	3

Semifinals
(Spain) Marbella	0
(Russia) Kristall	8
(Portugal) Braga	6
(Germany) Real Münster	3
5th–8th classification
(Ukraine) Artur Music	12
(Ukraine) Molniya	3
(Russia) Krylia Sovetov	5
(Portugal) ACD O Sotão	4

Final
(Russia) Kristall (p)	3(1)
(Portugal) Braga	3(0)
Third place
(Spain) Marbella	6
(Germany) Real Münster	7
Fifth place
(Ukraine) Artur Music	11
(Russia) Krylia Sovetov	5
Seventh place
(Ukraine) Molniya	5
(Portugal) ACD O Sotão	7

=== Round of 16 ===
11 September 2020
08:00

ACD O Sotão (Portugal)	4–2	(Portugal) Os Nazarenos
Ruben 16', 22'; Pedro 17'; Batalha 21'	Report(ru)	18' (o.g.) Pedro; 32' Pombinha

Estádio do Viveiro
Referee: Gionni Matticoli (Italy)

11 September 2020
08:00

Real Münster (Germany)	9–3	(Belgium) Newteam Brussels
Perez 2', 18'; Meltzer 6', 29', 30'; Biermann 11', 28'; Kniller 19'; Caballero 24'	Report(ru)	8' Ben Azouz; 10', 21' Salem

Pitch 2
Referee: Sergio Soares (Portugal)

11 September 2020
09:30

Kristall (Russia)	7–1	(France) Marseille
Mauricinho 4', 11', 32'; Paporotnyi 16'; Krasnoshchekov 17'; Remizov 19', 21'	Report(ru)	11' Basquaise

Estádio do Viveiro
Referee: Attila Balint (Romania)

11 September 2020
09:30

Molniya (Ukraine)	6–4	(Switzerland) Grasshoppers
Suarez 4', 12', 24'; Gorovoi 16'; Antonio 21'; Rarot 36'	Report(ru)	16' Vn Gashi; 26' Vc Gashi; 34', 36' Hodel

Pitch 2
Referee: Emmanuel Vocale (Belgium)

11 September 2020
11:00

Braga (Portugal)	9–1	(Germany) Beach Royals Düsseldorf
Jordan Oliveira 3', 13', 20'; Léo Martins 5', 27'; Bokinha 19', 30'; Filipe da Silva 31'; Miguel P. 35'	Report(ru)	36' Addarii

Estádio do Viveiro
Referee: Matieu Dor (France)

11 September 2020
11:00

Sporting CP (Portugal)	3–6	(Russia) Krylia Sovetov
Pinhal 7'; Cepeda 9'; Belchior 15'	Report(ru)	3', 24' Duarte; 12', 23' Pinyaev; 27', 36' Bryshtel

Pitch 2
Referee: Saverio Bottalico (Italy)

11 September 2020
12:30

Marbella (Spain)	9–6	(Greece) Napoli Patron
Juanma 1'; Kuman 5', 7', 23'; Alex Jr. 11', 25', 26'; Fernando 18'; Cristian T. 30'	Report(ru)	1' Stavropoulos; 6', 32' Pampero; 9', 22' Laduche; 18' Papastathopoulos

Estádio do Viveiro
Referee: Sergio Soares (Portugal)

11 September 2020
12:30

Artur Music (Ukraine)	8–1	(Germany) Rostocker Robben
Pachev 1'; Llorenç 14', 17', 32'; Gori 26', 33'; Zborovskyi 30'; Krokhmaliuk 35'	Report(ru)	11' Knüppel

Pitch 2
Referee: Csaba Baghy (Hungary)

=== Quarter-finals ===
==== 9th–16th place ====
12 September 2020
09:30

Marseille (France)	3–6	(Switzerland) Grasshoppers
Franck 3'; David 4'; Basquaise 25'		12' (pen.) Rütimann; 15' Spaccarotella; 19' Frutos; 23' Valentin Gashi; 34', 35' Hodel

Estádio do Viveiro
Referee: Fiametta Susanna (Italy)

12 September 2020
09:30

Napoli Patron (Greece)	3–6	(Germany) Rostocker Robben

Pitch 2
Referee: Gionni Matticoli (Italy)

12 September 2020
11:00

Beach Royals Düsseldorf (Germany)	0–5	(Portugal) Sporting CP
		13', 30' Coimbra; 21', 36' Belchior; 22' Von

Estádio do Viveiro
Referee: Emmanuel Vocale (Belgium)

12 September 2020
11:00

Os Nazarenos (Portugal)	6–6 (a.e.t.)	(Belgium) Newteam Brussels
Penalties
	2–1

Pitch 2
Referee: Annett Unterbeck (Germany)

==== 1st–8th place ====
11 September 2020
15:30

ACD O Sotão (Portugal)	2–3	(Germany) Real Münster
Paredes 7'; Batalha 13'	Report(ru)	11', 24' Javi Torres; 19' Perez

Estádio do Viveiro
Referee: Saverio Bottalico (Italy)

11 September 2020
17:00

Kristall (Russia)	13–3	(Ukraine) Molniya
Zharikov 5'; Rodrigo 6', 9', 12', 30'; Shishin 19', 23'; Datiñha 22'; Remizov 23'; Mauricinho 24', 29', 32'; Krasnoshchekov 34'	Report(ru)	7' (o.g.) Paporotnyi; 24' Dubovyk; 29' Antonio

Estádio do Viveiro
Referee: Csaba Baghy (Hungary)

11 September 2020
18:30

Braga (Portugal)	6–0	(Russia) Krylia Sovetov
Miguel P. 5'; Bê Martins 10'; André 13'; Jordan Oliveira 16'; Léo Martins 26'; Jordan 34'	Report(ru)

Estádio do Viveiro
Referee: Attila Balint (Romania)

11 September 2020
18:30

Marbella (Spain)	7–7 (a.e.t.)	(Ukraine) Artur Music
Kuman 4', 6', 11', 33'; Juanma 12'; Ivan 16'; Juanji 17'	Report(ru)	1', 12', 35' Llorenç; 20' Voitenko; 24' Zborovskyi; 28', 34' Gori
Penalties
(penalty scored) Riduan; (penalty scored) Juanma; (penalty scored) Kuman	3–1	(penalty scored) Llorenç; (penalty missed) Gori

Pitch 2
Referee: Gionni Matticoli (Italy)

=== Semi-finals ===
==== 13th–16th place ====
12 September 2020
15:30

Napoli Patron (Greece)	3–5	(France) Marseille

Pitch 2
Referee: Renata Foris (Hungary)

12 September 2020
17:00

Beach Royals Düsseldorf (Germany)	7–2	(Belgium) Newteam Brussels

Pitch 2
Referee: Fiametta Susanna (Italy)

==== 9th–12th place ====
12 September 2020
18:30

Sporting CP (Portugal)	5–1	(Portugal) Os Nazarenos
Coimbra 10', 17' (pen.); Von 23'; Belchior 30'; Zé Miguel 33'		9' Vitor

Estádio do Viveiro
Referee: Matieu Dor (France)

12 September 2020
18:30

Rostocker Robben (Germany)	2–3	(Switzerland) Grasshoppers

Pitch 2
Referee: Sergio Soares (Portugal)

==== 5th–8th place ====
12 September 2020
12:30

Artur Music (Ukraine)	12–3	(Ukraine) Molniya
Gori 2', 6', 19', 28'; Llorenç 10', 26', 29', 35', 36'; Zborovskyi 12', 17', 22'	Report(ru)	14' Rarot; 19', 32' Suárez

Pitch 2
Referee: Matieu Dor (France)

12 September 2020
17:00

Krylia Sovetov (Russia)	5–4	(Portugal) ACD O Sotão
Bryshtel 22', 26', 30', 34'; Kartashov 31'	Report(ru)	15', 15', 34', 34' Chiky

Estádio do Viveiro
Referee: Emmanuel Vocale (Belgium)

==== 1st–4th place ====
12 September 2020
14:00

Braga (Portugal)	6–3	(Germany) Real Münster
Bê Martins 20'; Jordan Oliveira 21', 29'; Filipe da Silva 24'; Bokinha 34'; Jordan 35'	Report(ru)	11' Javi Torres; 28', 31' Biermann

Estádio do Viveiro
Referee: Csaba Baghy (Hungary)

12 September 2020
15:30

Marbella (Spain)	0–8	(Russia) Kristall
	Report(ru)	7', 24' Paporotnyi; 12', 23' Mauricinho; 14' Rodrigo; 16' Remizov; 21' (pen.) Zharikov; 30' Ilinskii

Estádio do Viveiro
Referee: Sergio Soares (Portugal)

=== Finals ===
==== 15th place match ====
13 September 2020
09:00

Napoli Patron (Greece)	0–3	(Belgium) Newteam Brussels

Pitch 2

==== 13th place match ====
13 September 2020
09:00

Marseille (France)	4–6	(Germany) Beach Royals Düsseldorf
Romrig 13' (o.g.); Basquaise 17'; Dionizio 31'; David 36'		9', 18', 22' Romrig; 16' Sand; 21' Addarii; 32' (pen.) Hoeveler

Estádio do Viveiro
Referee: Sergio Soares (Portugal)

==== 11th place match ====
13 September 2020
10:30

Rostocker Robben (Germany)	6–8 (a.e.t.)	(Portugal) Os Nazarenos

Pitch 2
Referee: Gionni Matticoli (Italy)

==== 9th place match ====
13 September 2020
10:30

Grasshoppers (Switzerland)	3–5	(Portugal) Sporting CP
Carpita 6'; Hodel 9' (pen.), 36'		6' Dias; 14' Seixas; 19' Belchior; 20' Cepeda; 34' Ricardinho

Estádio do Viveiro
Referee: Csaba Baghy (Hungary)

==== 7th place match ====
13 September 2020
12:00

Molniya (Ukraine)	5–7	(Portugal) ACD O Sotão
Cherevko 6'; Dubovyk 9', 22'; Suarez 19', 27'	Report(ru)	1', 23' Pedro; 4', 33' Ruben; 18' Fabinho; 30' Batalha; 34' Chiky

Estádio do Viveiro
Referee: Attila Balint (Romania)

==== 5th place match ====
13 September 2020
13:30

Artur Music (Ukraine)	11–5	(Russia) Krylia Sovetov
Llorenç 3', 12', 25'; Gori 1', 17', 21', 24'; Zborovskyi 21', 27', 35'; Pashko 28'	Report(ru)	13', 21', 36' Bryshtel; 16' (pen.) Reshetnev; 25' Mikhailov

Estádio do Viveiro
Referee: Csaba Baghy (Hungary)

==== 3rd place match ====
13 September 2020
15:00

Marbella (Spain)	6–7	(Germany) Real Münster
Kuman 3', 32', 34'; Cristian T. 20'; Riduan 20'; Alex Jr. 23'	Report(ru)	1', 7', 11' Perez; 3', 21' Biermann; 12', 28' (pen.) Meltzer

Estádio do Viveiro
Referee: Emmanuel Vocale (Belgium)

==== Final ====
13 September 2020
18:00

Kristall (Russia)	3–3 (a.e.t.)	(Portugal) Braga
Datinha 6'; Zharikov 12'; Mauricinho 22'	Report(ru)	2' Bê Martins; 10' Bokinha; 14' (pen.) Jordan Oliveira
Penalties
Rodrigo (penalty scored); Datinha (penalty missed)	1–0	(penalty missed) Bokinha; (penalty missed) Jordan; (penalty missed) Bê Martins

Estádio do Viveiro
Referee: Gionni Matticoli (Italy)

== Awards ==
The following individual awards were presented after the final.

Top scorer(s)
(Spain) Llorenç Gómez ( (Ukraine) Artur Music)
22 goals
Best player
(Brazil) Mauricinho ( Kristall)
Best goalkeeper
(Brazil) Rafa Padilha ( Braga)

== Top goalscorers ==
Players with at least seven goals

22 goals

- (Spain) Llorenç Gómez ( (Ukraine) Artur Music)

21 goals

- (Italy) Gabriele Gori ( (Ukraine) Artur Music)

16 goals

- (Switzerland) Glenn Hodel ( (Switzerland) Grasshoppers)

14 goals

- (Belarus) Ihar Bryshtel ( (Russia) Krylia Sovetov)
- (Brazil) Filipe da Silva ( (Portugal) Braga)

13 goals

- (Spain) Kuman ( (Spain) Marbella)
- (Uruguay) Gaston Laduche ( (Greece) Napoli Patron)
- (Germany) Christian Biermann ( (Germany) Real Münster)
- (Spain) Eduard Suárez ( (Ukraine) Molniya)

12 goals

- (Germany) Oliver Romrig ( (Germany) Beach Royals Dusseldorf)
- (Brazil) Mauricinho ( (Russia) Kristall)

11 goals

- (Spain) Pablo Perez ( (Germany) Real Münster)

10 goals

- (Ukraine) Oleg Zborovskyi ( (Ukraine) Artur Music)
- (Germany) Joscha Metzler ( (Germany) Real Münster)

9 goals

- (Spain) Chiky Ardil ( (Portugal) ACD O Sotão)
- (Italy) Luca Addarii ( (Germany) Beach Royals Dusseldorf)
- (Brazil) Rodrigo ( (Russia) Kristall)
- (Brazil) Jordan Oliveira ( (Portugal) Braga)

8 goals

- (Spain) Cristian Torres ( (Spain) Marbella)
- (Germany) Max Krötsching ( (Germany) Rostocker Robben)

7 goals

- (Portugal) Lucio Carmo ( (Portugal) Os Nazarenos)
- (French Polynesia) Heirauarii Salem ( (Belgium) Newteam Brussels)
- (Portugal) Miguel Pintado ( (Portugal) Braga)

== Final standings ==
Rank	Team	Result
1	(Russia) Kristall	Champions (3rd title)
2	(Portugal) Braga	Runners-up
3	Real Münster	Third place
4	Marbella	
5	Artur Music	
6	Krylia Sovetov	
7	ACD O Sotão	
8	Molniya	
9	Sporting CP	
10	Grasshoppers	
11	(Portugal) Os Nazarenos	
12	Rostocker Robben	
13	Beach Royals Düsseldorf	
14	Marseille	
15	Newteam Brussels	
16	Napoli Patron	

== See also ==
- 2020 Women's Euro Winners Cup
- 2019–20 UEFA Futsal Champions League
