= National Museum of Natural History and Science, Lisbon =

Museum in Lisbon, Portugal

National Museum of Natural History and Science
- Museu Nacional de História Natural e da Ciência (MUHNAC)
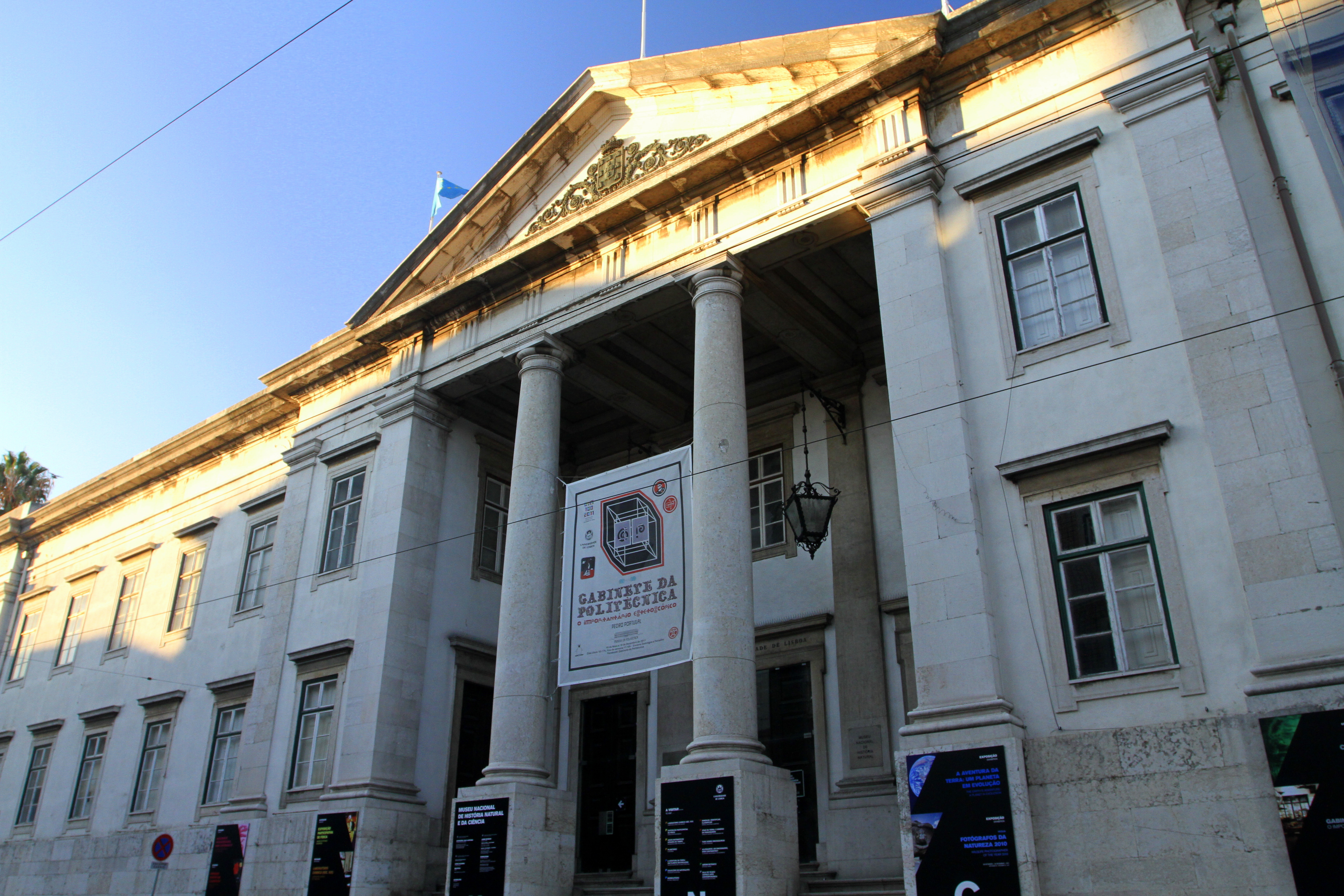
- Façade of the museum's main building at Rua da Escola Politécnica, Lisbon
- Former name: Part of the Real Museu (1768-1861); Museu Nacional de Lisboa (1861-1926); Museu Nacional de História Natural (1926-2011); Museu de Ciência da Universidade de Lisboa (1985-2011)
- Established: 1768; 1858 (current location); 1985 (University Science Museum); October 2011 (current structure)
- Location: Lisbon, Portugal
- Coordinates: 38°43′3.76″N 9°9′3.24″W
- Director: Marta C. Lourenço
- Owner: University of Lisbon
- Public transit access: Rato
- Website: www.museus.ulisboa.pt

The National Museum of Natural History and Science (MUHNAC) (Portuguese: Museu Nacional de História Natural e da Ciência) in Lisbon, Portugal is the country's main museum focusing on nature. Situated in the old Polytechnic School (and later School of Science) building in the city centre, the museum is managed as a department of the University of Lisbon.

Tracing its roots back to the 18th century, its rich collections reflect a gathering and study effort of more than 250 years, spanning zoology, anthropology, geology and botany. The museum shares grounds with the Lisbon Botanical Gardens [pt], and also counts with the Lisbon Astronomical Observatory in Tapada da Ajuda as well as the Tropical Botanical Gardens and Calheta Palace in Belém under its wing in the western side of the city.

The museum regularly organises and hosts activities for the promotion of natural history and science awareness, with space for artistic exhibitions, conferences, debates, workshops and courses.

== History ==
Its recent public designation, "MNHNC - National Museum of Natural History and Science", was created in October 2011. This incorporated the former National Museum of Natural History and the University of Lisbon Science Museum, integrating their collections, the historical buildings of the Polytechnic School, the Lisbon Botanical Gardens and, since July 2012, the Lisbon Astronomical Observatory :

The history of natural history collections in Lisbon began in the Royal Natural Cabinet and Botanical Garden, created in the second half of the eighteenth century, in Ajuda (western Lisbon). It was then housed for a short period in the Royal Academy of Sciences and transferred to the Polytechnic School in 1858, with the denomination of National Museum of Lisbon (1861) and under the administration of the Polytechnic School.

The second Botanic Gardens of Lisbon, in the grounds of the Polytechnic School officially opened in 1878.

In 1911, with the creation of the University of Lisbon, the Museum was annexed to the Faculty of Sciences.

In March 1978 a devastating fire destroyed part of the building of the former Polytechnic School, most of the zoology collection and part of the geology collection. The Faculty of Sciences would eventually move to its current premises in Campo Grande.

The Science Museum of the University of Lisbon was created in May 1985, sharing the building with the National Museum of Natural History.

Both museums adopted new by-laws in 2003, becoming autonomous from the Faculty of Sciences and under the direct administration of the Rector of the University of Lisbon.

== See also ==
- University of Lisbon
