= Sadagat Valiyeva =

Azerbaijani beach soccer referee and footballer

Personal information
- Date of birth: 5 May 1989 (age 37)
- Position: Forward

Senior career*
Years	Team	Apps	(Gls)
- Ruslan-93

International career^{‡}
2005	Azerbaijan U19	1	(0)
2010	Azerbaijan	5	(0)
- * Club domestic league appearances and goals ‡ National team caps and goals as of 25 August 2010

Sadagat Valiyeva (Azerbaijani: Sədaqət Vəliyeva; born 5 May 1989) is an Azerbaijani beach soccer referee and a former footballer who played as a forward. She has been a member of the Azerbaijan women's national team.

== Referee career ==
Valiyeva was a referee in two matches at the 2018 Women's Euro Winners Cup.
