= Lisbon Astronomical Observatory =

- Observatório Astronómico de Lisboa
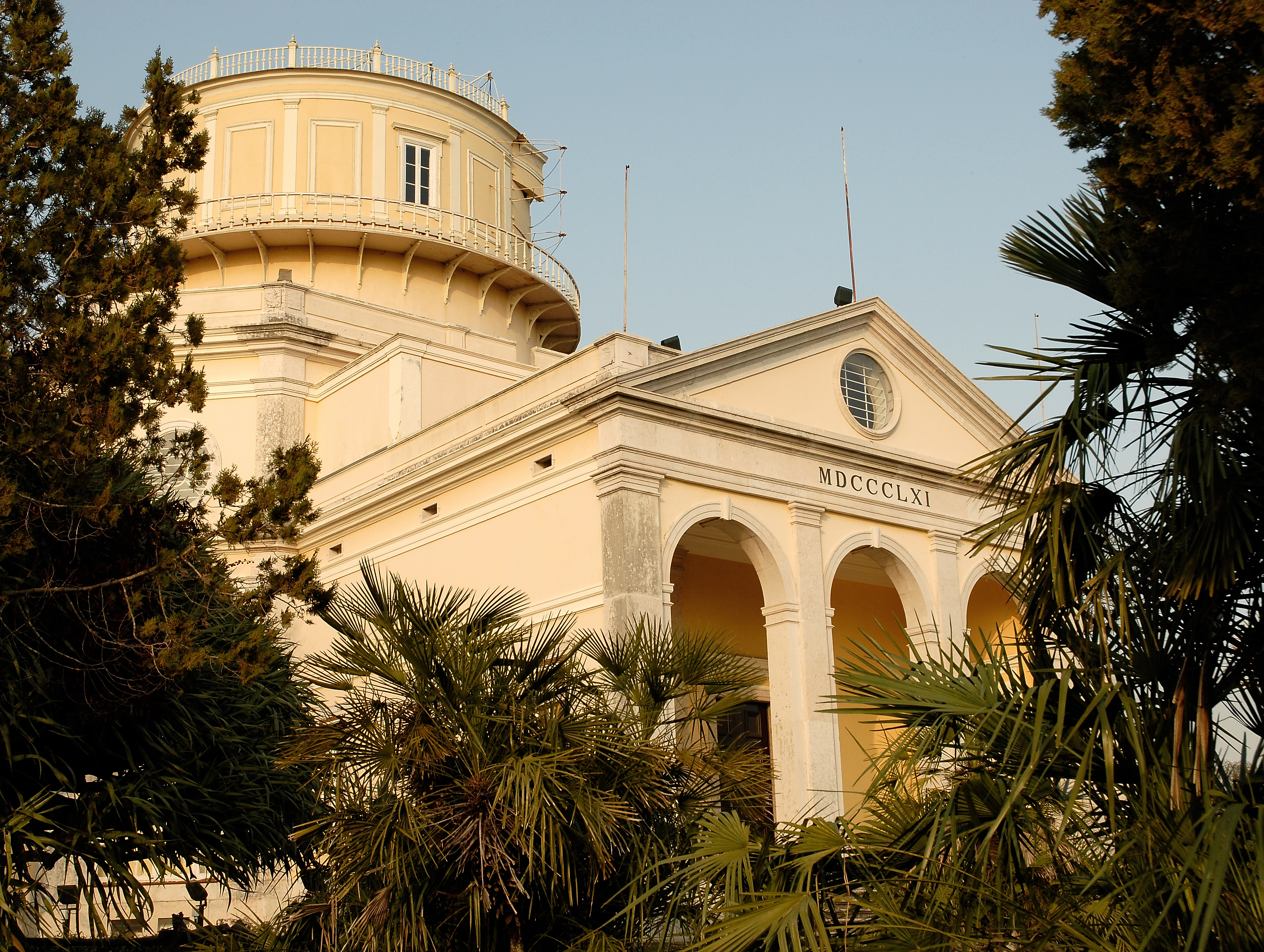

- Location within Lisbon

General information
- Type: Astronomical Observatory
- Location: Portugal
- Coordinates: 38°42′37.94″N 9°11′15.02″W
- Opened: 1812
- Owner: Portuguese Republic

Technical details
- Material: Mixed masonry

Design and construction
- Architect: Jean François Gille Colson

Website
- www.oal.ul.pt

The Lisbon Astronomical Observatory (Portuguese: Observatório Astronómico de Lisboa) is an astronomical observatory located in Tapada da Ajuda, in the civil parish of Alcântara, municipality of Lisbon. Recognized internationally for its quality of work in the field of positional astronomy (since the 19th century), in 1992, it became a dependency of the University of Lisbon (and later, part of the Faculty of Sciences), responsible for scientific and historical research, along with media relations. It is now a museum managed by the National Museum of Natural History and Science, Lisbon.

== History ==
From an 1812 map, there existed in the Alto da Casa Branca in the Tapada of Ajuda an older observatory.

The observatory was born from great controversy between French astronomer Hervé Faye (1814-1902), then director of the Observatory of Paris, and Peters, an astronomer at the Russian Observatory of Pulkova, on the parallax of the star of Argelander. The construction of the Lisbon observatory was due to a strong desire to build an institution that was a reference in Portuguese culture. It was established in the mid-19th century with the aim of promoting new Sidereal Astronomy, discovery and understanding of the infinite cosmos, and concern about the exact mapping of the sky and measuring the size of the universe. In 1850, Hervé Faye and Friedrich Georg Wilhelm von Struve (1793-1864) proposed that astronomical observations should be taken in Lisbon, being the first and "unique locale in all of continental Europe that the zenithal telescope could encounter the marvelous Argelander star". In order to do so, it was necessary to build a new observatory where you could install the appropriate equipment. The Count of Lavradio proposed that the government's chamber of peers should acquire Faye's telescope.

The government named a commission, presided by José Feliciano da Silva Costa (1797-1866) and driven by Filipe Folque (1800-1874), to construct a new observatory, since the Royal Military Observatory (Portuguese: Observatório Real da Marinha) did not have the conditions. In January 1857, King D. Pedro V destined 30 contos de réis to the construction of the observatory and decreed a new commission, managed by Filipe Folque. The commission thought, initially, of constructing the new building in the Prince Royal's garden, then alternately in the Edward VII Park and later the Tapada da Ajuda.

The plan of the building, executed by the French architects Jean François Gille Colson (1861-1865), José da Costa Sequeira (1800-1872) and Valentim José Correia (1822-1900) (then the most distinguished foreign architect living in Lisbon), was inspired by the building of the Russian Observatory in Pulkova. Wilhelm Struve, then-director at Pulkova offered his services to the Portuguese government and became the main adviser, playing a very important role in the choice of equipment and the orientation of astronomer Frederico Augusto Oom (1830-1890), who was given a rough 5-year training session. Oom, was as a Navy Lieutenant and hydrographic engineer, who eventually became the first director of the Royal Astronomical Observatory of Lisbon and who ultimately had a very important role in the whole foundation of this building.

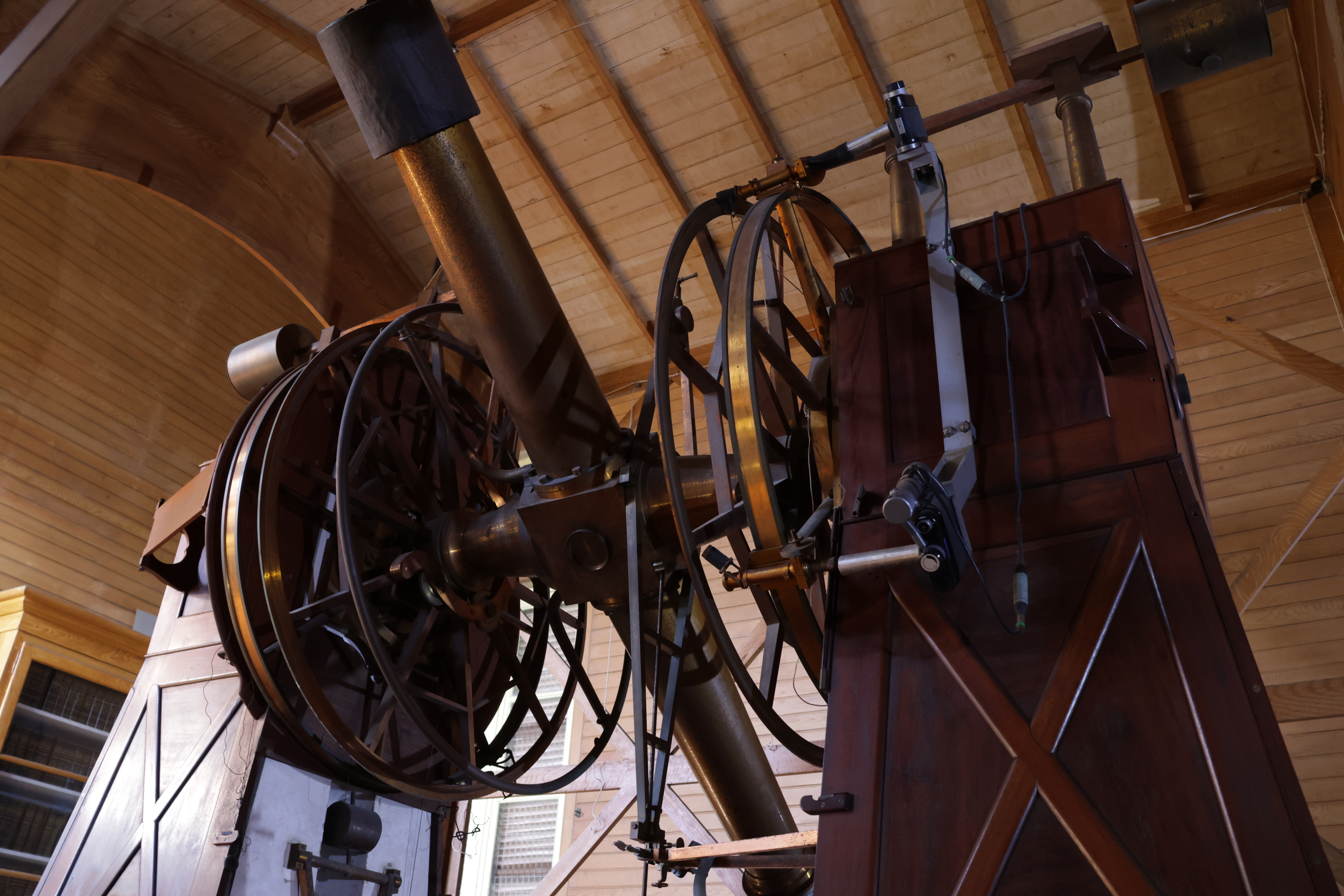
Meridian circle in the West wing of the Astronomical Observatory of Lisbon, used for astrometry. This optical instrument, which moves only along the meridian (North-South), was used to measure the precise positions of stars and other celestial objects. Aperture is 135 mm and focal length is nearly 2 metres. Built in 1861 by A. & G. Repsold (Hamburg) and Georg Mërz (Munich).

D. Pedro V approved the installation of the astronomic observatory in the Tapada, but its construction started on 11 March 1861, during the reign of King Luis I. The King also contributed to the fund, withdrawing money from his personal budget for the project. The observatory would have been erected in the Alto da Casa Branca, the locale of the older observatory, but was actually situated in the Alto da Eira Velha. Construction work was completed in 1867 and the first observations began at the site between 1867 and 1869. The Lisbon Astronomical Observatory was formally established by decree on 6 May 1878.

Between 1900 and 1901, the observatory participated in the solar parallax campaign, centered on the observations of the asteroid Eros, using a circular meridian measuring instrument to improve the value of the Astronomical unit. It also contributed to production of a high-quality catalogue of reference stars; the observatory contributed with data and weight to all 3800 observations used in the catalogue. For this work, in 1904, its director César Augusto de Campos Rodrigues (1836-1919), received the Valz Prize, by the French Academy of Sciences in Paris.

In 1995, the observatory was integrated into the University of Lisbon. The first renovations began in the cupola of the rotational tower in 1999.

From May 2004, the investigation project Fundamentação de Critérios para a Musealização do Observatório Astronómico de Lisboa, financed by FCT (POCTI/HAR/48711/2002) and under the University of Lisbon's Faculty of Sciences and UTL's Faculty of Architecture.

== Architecture ==
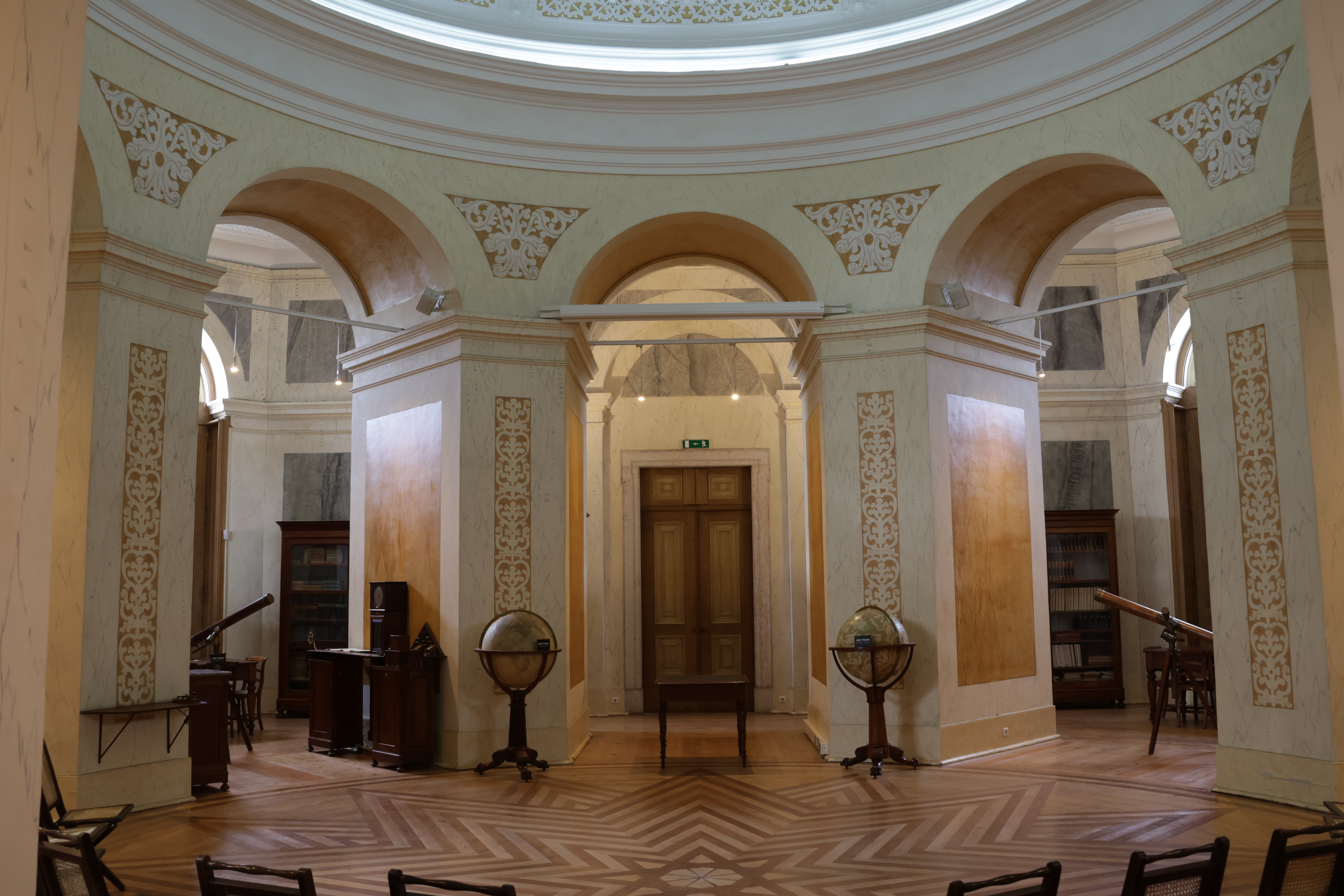
Central room of the Astronomical Observatory of Lisbon

The Lisbon Astronomical Observatory consists of a central building on the hills of Ajuda and overlooking the Tejo river, and two small cupolas in the south containing instruments. Besides the central cupola there are three rooms for astronomical observations, equipped with instruments (the best for the time) and windows for observation.

The central block of the observatory (a circular room) supports the weight of the large equatorial refractor over 8 large columns. Under the arches between the columns are many pendulum clocks used over the century to measure the time. At the foot of the large windows (with a view over the Tapada da Ajuda) are wide tables, used by astronomers to assist in their research/investigation. In addition, there are spacious halls linking the central block, used for lessons, taking measurements and research, today used as workshops and support school educational activities.

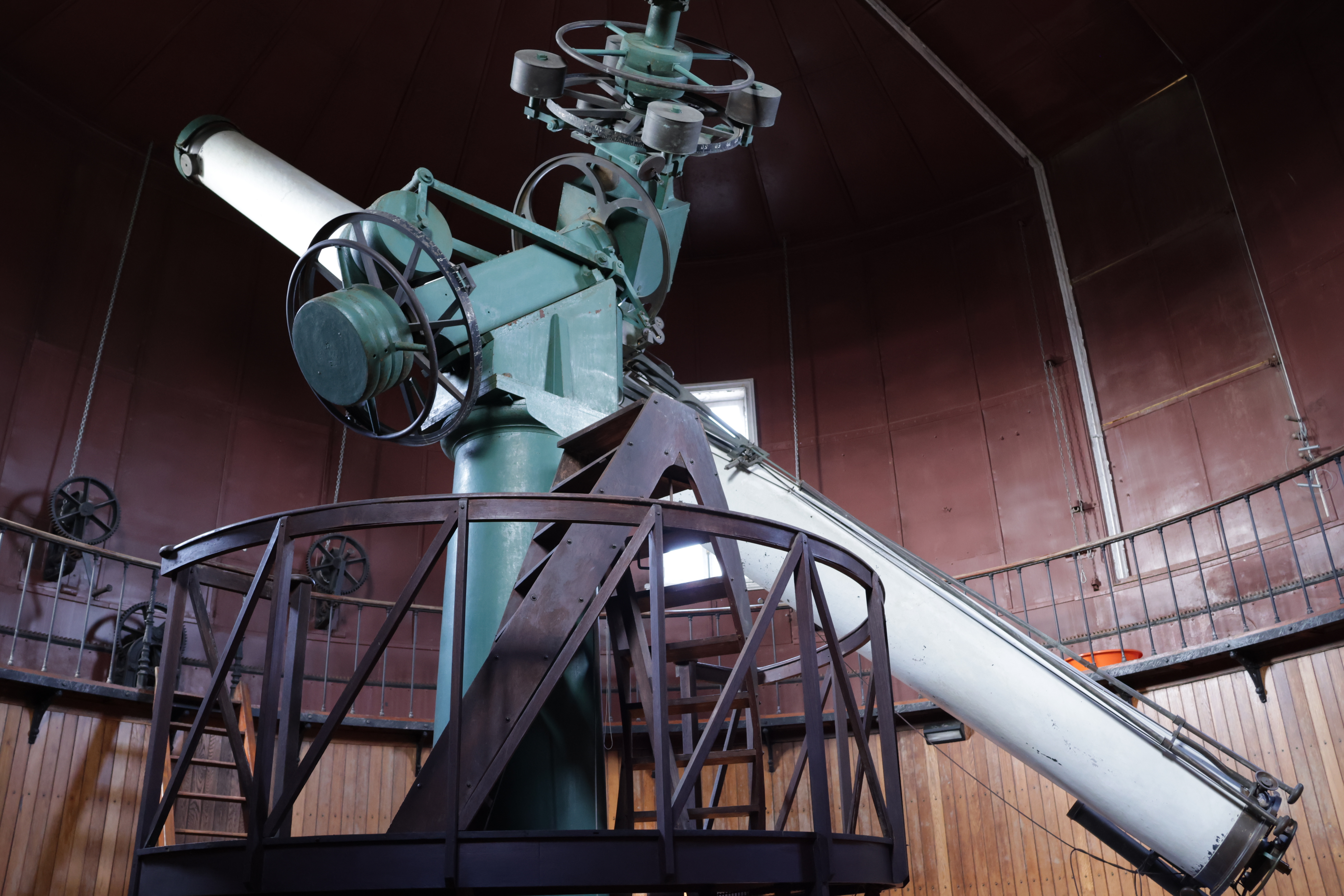
Main equatorial telescope of the Astronomical Observatory of Lisbon, dated from 1864. It was used to study nebulae (which at the time included what we now call galaxies), measure distances to stars based on their parallax, as well as observe stellar occultations by the Moon, and also to study planets and comets. Built by A. & G. Repsold, in Hamburg, and lenses produced by Georg Mërz in Munich. Aperture 38.2 cm and focal length of 6.82 metres. Weights 7 tones.

The three observation rooms are spacious, high, and lined in wood, with open space between the wainscoting and the walls of masonry and roofing. This space communicates with the outside through gaps that are constantly open. There are flues on the roofs of the rooms for air circulation, and this permanent ventilation maintains a balance between the air temperature inside the rooms and outside, as is convenient for the accuracy of the observations. The wooden wainscoting provides thermal insulation, being also a 100% ecological product, and offers the user a "friendlier" environment compared to other substitute materials. The rooms have openings in the lateral walls and in the ceiling, thanks to a specific mechanism. Once these panels are opened, they offer a view onto the sky, along the meridian of Lisbon, that is, in the north-south direction.
