= Time in Portugal =

Time in Europe: Light Blue / Western European Time / Greenwich Mean Time (UTC); Blue / Western European Time / Greenwich Mean Time (UTC); Blue / Western European Summer Time / British Summer Time / Irish Standard Time (UTC+1); Red / Central European Time (UTC+1); Red / Central European Summer Time (UTC+2); Yellow / Eastern European Time / Kaliningrad Time (UTC+2); Ochre / Eastern European Time (UTC+2); Ochre / Eastern European Summer Time (UTC+3); Green / Moscow Time / Turkey Time (UTC+3); Turquoise / Armenia Time / Azerbaijan Time / Georgia Time / Samara Time (UTC+4); ▉▉▉▉ Pale hues: Standard time observed all year ▉▉▉ Dark hues: Daylight saving time

Portugal has two time zones and observes daylight saving time. Continental Portugal and Madeira use UTC+00:00, while the Azores use UTC–01:00. Daylight saving time (locally known as Hora de Verão, meaning "summer time") is observed nationwide from the last Sunday in March to the last Sunday in October, when continental Portugal and Madeira advance one hour to UTC+01:00, and the Azores advances one hour to UTC+00:00.

== History ==
In the early 19th century, Portugal adopted mean solar time. Navy (located in Lisbon) and Coimbra Astronomical Observatories calculated solar time to be used as legal time in their longitude regions. In 1861, the Astronomical Observatory of Lisbon was founded and, in 1878, it was tasked with the exclusive competence of calculate its mean solar time and to transmit it to rest of the country's public services. Thus, in practice, Portuguese standard time was defined as the mean solar time at Lisbon Observatory longitude, which was later calculated as being GMT–00:36:45.

In 1911, it was agreed that standard time in Portugal should be defined in accordance with the 1884 prime meridian system. By the Decree of 26 May 1911, a reform was approved regarding standard time in Portugal and in its overseas Empire: although most of continental Portugal is located west of the 7º 30'W meridian (i.e. in the theoretical zone of UTC-01:00 time zone), mainland Portugal adopted UTC+00:00 as its time zone. By the same law, UTC-02:00 time zone was adopted for the Azores and Cape Verde, UTC-01:00 for Madeira and Portuguese Guinea, UTC+00:00 for São Tomé and Príncipe and São João Baptista de Ajudá, UTC+01:00 for Angola, UTC+02:00 for Mozambique, UTC+05:00 for Portuguese India and UTC+08:00 for Macau and Portuguese Timor. These time zones were adopted on 1 January 1912.

Daylight saving time (Hora de Verão, or "summer time", in Portuguese) was observed for the first time in 1916, during World War I, and it consisted in advancing clocks by one hour. In that year, DST was observed from 17 June to 1 November but in following years until 1921, it was observed from 1 June to 14 October.

DST continued to be observed every year in 1920s and 1930s, although some small interruptions had occurred (1922–1923, 1925, 1930 and 1933), as well as the start and end date of DST, which often varied.

Between 1942 and 1945, during World War II, Portugal not only advanced clocks by one hour during DST, as also advanced them by another hour during some months of those years, coming to have clocks two hours ahead of GMT, effectively observing "double DST". Portugal returned to GMT following the end of the war in 1945, and one hour of DST continued to be observed. In 1948, it was approved that DST should be observed from the first Sunday in April to the first Sunday in October.

From 1966, DST was observed year-round, so that, in practice, Portugal changed its time zone from WET (UTC+00:00) to CET (UTC+01:00). However, due to the later sunrises and sunsets, many complaints accumulated: on winter mornings, people went to work under a completely dark sky, and at 09:00, when school classes started, the sun was still rising, which eventually had repercussions on students' school performance and their safety during morning trips from home to school. Furthermore, in the 1970s, the idea of reintroducing DST as an energy saving measure gained strength in Europe as well as in Portugal. However, although there were so many complaints in the country with the use of UTC+01:00 year round, it became clear to policymakers that if DST was to be re-introduced, it could never be observed as CEST (UTC+02:00), and the only solution was to re-adopt WET as standard time. Therefore, Portugal re-adopted Western European Time (UTC+00:00) as its standard time in 1976. DST started to be observed every year as WEST (UTC+01:00), usually from early April to late September. From 1981 on, DST started to be observed from the last Sunday in March to the last Sunday in September.

In 1986, time in Portugal began to be calculated in accordance with UTC rather than GMT.

=== Switch to Central European Time ===
In 1992, during the government of Aníbal Cavaco Silva, by Decree-Law 124/92, mainland Portugal officially changed its time zone from Western European Time to Central European Time. Unlike the 1966 change to CET, DST was observed as Central European Summer Time (UTC+02:00), from the last Sunday in March to the last Sunday in September. The measure, approved without the consultation of Lisbon Observatory, had the intention of promoting energy savings, in order that "Portugal follow, in work schedules, the countries with which it maintains more frequent contacts" (DL 124/92) and so promoting economic growth. However, the measure quickly proved to be a failure in achieving its objectives and became unpopular: on winter mornings, the sun was still rising at 09:00 and people travelled to work in the dark. Children also began the school day in darkness, with repercussions on their standards of learning, school performance and sleeping habits. It was even common that children fell asleep in the early morning classes. On summer evenings, the usage of Central European Summer Time was revealed to have a disturbing effect on peoples', especially children's, sleeping habits, as the sun was still setting as late as 22:30, so the sky was only completely dark towards midnight. A company hired by The European Commission conducted a study which concluded that, in fact, there were no energy savings because, due to the dark early mornings, workers turned on lights in their offices and forgot to turn them off, leaving them switched on for the rest of the morning, which increased energy consumption. Concerns also emerged about the effect of the coincidence of rush hours with the hottest hours of the day on air pollution. Furthermore, an increase in the number of assaults on children in the morning was observed, and insurance companies reported a rise in the number of accidents. Due to all of these concerns and complaints, it became clear that situation could not continue much longer without a new analysis. In December 1995, the government (now led by António Guterres) commissioned a report to Lisbon Observatory on the issue of Portuguese standard time. In February 1996, the Observatory report was released and it concluded that owing to the geographical position of Portugal, the country should re-adopt Western European Time as its standard time zone, a position that the policymakers accepted.

=== Return to Western European Time ===
In 1996, new legislation was approved. By Decree-Law 17/96, mainland Portugal returned to the Western European Time time zone. DST would continue to be observed as WEST (UTC+01:00) from the last Sunday in March to the last Sunday in October, thus also adopting the then recently changed EU rules regarding DST. In the same year, Azores and Madeira regional parliaments also approved regional laws that adapted the new EU rules to their time zones, thus ensuring that DST would be observed from the last Sunday in March to last Sunday in October in the entire Portuguese realm.

== Date and time notation ==
In 1996 Portugal adopted ISO 8601 via EN 28601 as NP EN 28601:1996.

== Time signalling ==
The Astronomical Observatory of Lisbon participates in the network distribution of UTC information via the Network Time Protocol (NTP), e.g. via "ntp02.oal.ul.pt" and "ntp04.oal.ul.pt".

== IANA time zone database ==
The IANA time zone database contains three zones for Portugal. Columns marked with * are from the file zone.tab from the database.

c.c.*	coordinates*	TZ*	comments*	UTC offset	DST	Notes
PT	+3843−00908	Europe/Lisbon	Portugal (mainland)	+00:00	+01:00	
PT	+3238−01654	Atlantic/Madeira	Madeira Islands	+00:00	+01:00	
PT	+3744−02540	Atlantic/Azores	Azores	−01:00	+00:00	
